

94001–94100 

|-bgcolor=#E9E9E9
| 94001 ||  || — || December 4, 2000 || Socorro || LINEAR || ADE || align=right | 4.8 km || 
|-id=002 bgcolor=#d6d6d6
| 94002 ||  || — || December 4, 2000 || Socorro || LINEAR || — || align=right | 9.2 km || 
|-id=003 bgcolor=#E9E9E9
| 94003 ||  || — || December 4, 2000 || Socorro || LINEAR || — || align=right | 3.3 km || 
|-id=004 bgcolor=#d6d6d6
| 94004 ||  || — || December 4, 2000 || Socorro || LINEAR || EOS || align=right | 4.8 km || 
|-id=005 bgcolor=#E9E9E9
| 94005 ||  || — || December 4, 2000 || Socorro || LINEAR || — || align=right | 2.7 km || 
|-id=006 bgcolor=#d6d6d6
| 94006 ||  || — || December 4, 2000 || Socorro || LINEAR || EOS || align=right | 4.2 km || 
|-id=007 bgcolor=#E9E9E9
| 94007 ||  || — || December 4, 2000 || Socorro || LINEAR || — || align=right | 6.9 km || 
|-id=008 bgcolor=#d6d6d6
| 94008 ||  || — || December 4, 2000 || Socorro || LINEAR || — || align=right | 6.1 km || 
|-id=009 bgcolor=#d6d6d6
| 94009 ||  || — || December 4, 2000 || Socorro || LINEAR || — || align=right | 7.6 km || 
|-id=010 bgcolor=#E9E9E9
| 94010 ||  || — || December 4, 2000 || Socorro || LINEAR || EUN || align=right | 3.2 km || 
|-id=011 bgcolor=#E9E9E9
| 94011 ||  || — || December 4, 2000 || Socorro || LINEAR || EUN || align=right | 4.1 km || 
|-id=012 bgcolor=#d6d6d6
| 94012 ||  || — || December 4, 2000 || Socorro || LINEAR || — || align=right | 8.8 km || 
|-id=013 bgcolor=#E9E9E9
| 94013 ||  || — || December 4, 2000 || Socorro || LINEAR || MAR || align=right | 2.7 km || 
|-id=014 bgcolor=#E9E9E9
| 94014 ||  || — || December 4, 2000 || Socorro || LINEAR || — || align=right | 2.1 km || 
|-id=015 bgcolor=#E9E9E9
| 94015 ||  || — || December 4, 2000 || Socorro || LINEAR || EUN || align=right | 3.4 km || 
|-id=016 bgcolor=#E9E9E9
| 94016 ||  || — || December 4, 2000 || Socorro || LINEAR || — || align=right | 3.4 km || 
|-id=017 bgcolor=#d6d6d6
| 94017 ||  || — || December 4, 2000 || Socorro || LINEAR || — || align=right | 6.5 km || 
|-id=018 bgcolor=#E9E9E9
| 94018 ||  || — || December 4, 2000 || Socorro || LINEAR || ADE || align=right | 5.8 km || 
|-id=019 bgcolor=#d6d6d6
| 94019 ||  || — || December 4, 2000 || Socorro || LINEAR || EOS || align=right | 3.7 km || 
|-id=020 bgcolor=#E9E9E9
| 94020 ||  || — || December 4, 2000 || Socorro || LINEAR || — || align=right | 2.3 km || 
|-id=021 bgcolor=#d6d6d6
| 94021 ||  || — || December 4, 2000 || Socorro || LINEAR || — || align=right | 7.8 km || 
|-id=022 bgcolor=#d6d6d6
| 94022 ||  || — || December 4, 2000 || Socorro || LINEAR || — || align=right | 8.3 km || 
|-id=023 bgcolor=#E9E9E9
| 94023 ||  || — || December 5, 2000 || Socorro || LINEAR || MAR || align=right | 4.0 km || 
|-id=024 bgcolor=#E9E9E9
| 94024 ||  || — || December 5, 2000 || Socorro || LINEAR || — || align=right | 3.9 km || 
|-id=025 bgcolor=#E9E9E9
| 94025 ||  || — || December 5, 2000 || Socorro || LINEAR || EUN || align=right | 2.3 km || 
|-id=026 bgcolor=#E9E9E9
| 94026 ||  || — || December 4, 2000 || Socorro || LINEAR || JUN || align=right | 3.0 km || 
|-id=027 bgcolor=#E9E9E9
| 94027 ||  || — || December 4, 2000 || Socorro || LINEAR || MAR || align=right | 3.4 km || 
|-id=028 bgcolor=#E9E9E9
| 94028 ||  || — || December 4, 2000 || Socorro || LINEAR || — || align=right | 4.5 km || 
|-id=029 bgcolor=#E9E9E9
| 94029 ||  || — || December 4, 2000 || Socorro || LINEAR || — || align=right | 3.6 km || 
|-id=030 bgcolor=#E9E9E9
| 94030 ||  || — || December 5, 2000 || Socorro || LINEAR || — || align=right | 11 km || 
|-id=031 bgcolor=#E9E9E9
| 94031 ||  || — || December 5, 2000 || Socorro || LINEAR || — || align=right | 3.8 km || 
|-id=032 bgcolor=#d6d6d6
| 94032 ||  || — || December 5, 2000 || Socorro || LINEAR || ALA || align=right | 13 km || 
|-id=033 bgcolor=#d6d6d6
| 94033 ||  || — || December 5, 2000 || Socorro || LINEAR || — || align=right | 5.8 km || 
|-id=034 bgcolor=#E9E9E9
| 94034 ||  || — || December 15, 2000 || Socorro || LINEAR || — || align=right | 5.6 km || 
|-id=035 bgcolor=#E9E9E9
| 94035 ||  || — || December 4, 2000 || Socorro || LINEAR || — || align=right | 2.5 km || 
|-id=036 bgcolor=#d6d6d6
| 94036 ||  || — || December 4, 2000 || Socorro || LINEAR || NAE || align=right | 5.6 km || 
|-id=037 bgcolor=#E9E9E9
| 94037 ||  || — || December 4, 2000 || Socorro || LINEAR || — || align=right | 4.6 km || 
|-id=038 bgcolor=#d6d6d6
| 94038 ||  || — || December 4, 2000 || Socorro || LINEAR || SAN || align=right | 3.7 km || 
|-id=039 bgcolor=#E9E9E9
| 94039 ||  || — || December 6, 2000 || Socorro || LINEAR || — || align=right | 4.5 km || 
|-id=040 bgcolor=#E9E9E9
| 94040 ||  || — || December 6, 2000 || Socorro || LINEAR || — || align=right | 5.5 km || 
|-id=041 bgcolor=#E9E9E9
| 94041 ||  || — || December 6, 2000 || Socorro || LINEAR || DOR || align=right | 4.7 km || 
|-id=042 bgcolor=#d6d6d6
| 94042 ||  || — || December 6, 2000 || Socorro || LINEAR || — || align=right | 9.1 km || 
|-id=043 bgcolor=#d6d6d6
| 94043 ||  || — || December 6, 2000 || Socorro || LINEAR || — || align=right | 8.4 km || 
|-id=044 bgcolor=#E9E9E9
| 94044 ||  || — || December 15, 2000 || Uccle || T. Pauwels || HOF || align=right | 5.4 km || 
|-id=045 bgcolor=#E9E9E9
| 94045 ||  || — || December 11, 2000 || Siding Spring || R. H. McNaught || — || align=right | 2.9 km || 
|-id=046 bgcolor=#E9E9E9
| 94046 || 2000 YK || — || December 16, 2000 || Socorro || LINEAR || HNS || align=right | 2.8 km || 
|-id=047 bgcolor=#E9E9E9
| 94047 ||  || — || December 17, 2000 || Socorro || LINEAR || MAR || align=right | 3.0 km || 
|-id=048 bgcolor=#E9E9E9
| 94048 ||  || — || December 19, 2000 || Socorro || LINEAR || — || align=right | 4.1 km || 
|-id=049 bgcolor=#d6d6d6
| 94049 ||  || — || December 20, 2000 || Kitt Peak || Spacewatch || KOR || align=right | 2.8 km || 
|-id=050 bgcolor=#E9E9E9
| 94050 ||  || — || December 20, 2000 || Kitt Peak || Spacewatch || — || align=right | 5.5 km || 
|-id=051 bgcolor=#d6d6d6
| 94051 ||  || — || December 21, 2000 || Kitt Peak || Spacewatch || — || align=right | 5.6 km || 
|-id=052 bgcolor=#E9E9E9
| 94052 ||  || — || December 19, 2000 || Socorro || LINEAR || — || align=right | 4.5 km || 
|-id=053 bgcolor=#E9E9E9
| 94053 ||  || — || December 20, 2000 || Socorro || LINEAR || ADE || align=right | 4.0 km || 
|-id=054 bgcolor=#E9E9E9
| 94054 ||  || — || December 21, 2000 || Kitt Peak || Spacewatch || EUN || align=right | 3.0 km || 
|-id=055 bgcolor=#d6d6d6
| 94055 ||  || — || December 20, 2000 || Kitt Peak || Spacewatch || KOR || align=right | 2.8 km || 
|-id=056 bgcolor=#E9E9E9
| 94056 ||  || — || December 19, 2000 || Haleakala || NEAT || JUN || align=right | 2.1 km || 
|-id=057 bgcolor=#E9E9E9
| 94057 ||  || — || December 25, 2000 || Kitt Peak || Spacewatch || — || align=right | 5.7 km || 
|-id=058 bgcolor=#E9E9E9
| 94058 ||  || — || December 28, 2000 || Fountain Hills || C. W. Juels || HNS || align=right | 3.9 km || 
|-id=059 bgcolor=#E9E9E9
| 94059 ||  || — || December 20, 2000 || Socorro || LINEAR || — || align=right | 6.3 km || 
|-id=060 bgcolor=#E9E9E9
| 94060 ||  || — || December 20, 2000 || Socorro || LINEAR || GEF || align=right | 2.4 km || 
|-id=061 bgcolor=#E9E9E9
| 94061 ||  || — || December 20, 2000 || Socorro || LINEAR || — || align=right | 3.0 km || 
|-id=062 bgcolor=#E9E9E9
| 94062 ||  || — || December 29, 2000 || Desert Beaver || W. K. Y. Yeung || — || align=right | 3.1 km || 
|-id=063 bgcolor=#E9E9E9
| 94063 ||  || — || December 29, 2000 || Desert Beaver || W. K. Y. Yeung || — || align=right | 6.3 km || 
|-id=064 bgcolor=#d6d6d6
| 94064 ||  || — || December 22, 2000 || Socorro || LINEAR || KOR || align=right | 3.1 km || 
|-id=065 bgcolor=#E9E9E9
| 94065 ||  || — || December 28, 2000 || Socorro || LINEAR || — || align=right | 2.2 km || 
|-id=066 bgcolor=#d6d6d6
| 94066 ||  || — || December 29, 2000 || Desert Beaver || W. K. Y. Yeung || — || align=right | 5.7 km || 
|-id=067 bgcolor=#E9E9E9
| 94067 ||  || — || December 28, 2000 || Haleakala || NEAT || ADE || align=right | 5.2 km || 
|-id=068 bgcolor=#d6d6d6
| 94068 ||  || — || December 28, 2000 || Socorro || LINEAR || EOS || align=right | 4.3 km || 
|-id=069 bgcolor=#d6d6d6
| 94069 ||  || — || December 28, 2000 || Socorro || LINEAR || — || align=right | 6.7 km || 
|-id=070 bgcolor=#E9E9E9
| 94070 ||  || — || December 30, 2000 || Socorro || LINEAR || HEN || align=right | 2.6 km || 
|-id=071 bgcolor=#d6d6d6
| 94071 ||  || — || December 30, 2000 || Socorro || LINEAR || — || align=right | 8.3 km || 
|-id=072 bgcolor=#E9E9E9
| 94072 ||  || — || December 30, 2000 || Socorro || LINEAR || — || align=right | 3.4 km || 
|-id=073 bgcolor=#d6d6d6
| 94073 ||  || — || December 30, 2000 || Socorro || LINEAR || — || align=right | 8.6 km || 
|-id=074 bgcolor=#d6d6d6
| 94074 ||  || — || December 30, 2000 || Socorro || LINEAR || — || align=right | 4.7 km || 
|-id=075 bgcolor=#d6d6d6
| 94075 ||  || — || December 30, 2000 || Socorro || LINEAR || — || align=right | 5.5 km || 
|-id=076 bgcolor=#d6d6d6
| 94076 ||  || — || December 30, 2000 || Socorro || LINEAR || — || align=right | 5.1 km || 
|-id=077 bgcolor=#d6d6d6
| 94077 ||  || — || December 30, 2000 || Socorro || LINEAR || — || align=right | 3.9 km || 
|-id=078 bgcolor=#d6d6d6
| 94078 ||  || — || December 30, 2000 || Socorro || LINEAR || EOS || align=right | 4.7 km || 
|-id=079 bgcolor=#d6d6d6
| 94079 ||  || — || December 30, 2000 || Socorro || LINEAR || — || align=right | 7.6 km || 
|-id=080 bgcolor=#E9E9E9
| 94080 ||  || — || December 30, 2000 || Socorro || LINEAR || — || align=right | 2.8 km || 
|-id=081 bgcolor=#d6d6d6
| 94081 ||  || — || December 30, 2000 || Socorro || LINEAR || — || align=right | 6.9 km || 
|-id=082 bgcolor=#E9E9E9
| 94082 ||  || — || December 30, 2000 || Socorro || LINEAR || — || align=right | 1.9 km || 
|-id=083 bgcolor=#d6d6d6
| 94083 ||  || — || December 30, 2000 || Socorro || LINEAR || THM || align=right | 6.7 km || 
|-id=084 bgcolor=#E9E9E9
| 94084 ||  || — || December 30, 2000 || Socorro || LINEAR || RAF || align=right | 3.2 km || 
|-id=085 bgcolor=#d6d6d6
| 94085 ||  || — || December 30, 2000 || Socorro || LINEAR || — || align=right | 4.9 km || 
|-id=086 bgcolor=#d6d6d6
| 94086 ||  || — || December 30, 2000 || Socorro || LINEAR || THM || align=right | 4.4 km || 
|-id=087 bgcolor=#d6d6d6
| 94087 ||  || — || December 30, 2000 || Socorro || LINEAR || EOS || align=right | 4.4 km || 
|-id=088 bgcolor=#d6d6d6
| 94088 ||  || — || December 30, 2000 || Socorro || LINEAR || VER || align=right | 7.2 km || 
|-id=089 bgcolor=#d6d6d6
| 94089 ||  || — || December 30, 2000 || Socorro || LINEAR || KAR || align=right | 3.8 km || 
|-id=090 bgcolor=#E9E9E9
| 94090 ||  || — || December 30, 2000 || Socorro || LINEAR || — || align=right | 3.1 km || 
|-id=091 bgcolor=#d6d6d6
| 94091 ||  || — || December 30, 2000 || Socorro || LINEAR || — || align=right | 4.7 km || 
|-id=092 bgcolor=#d6d6d6
| 94092 ||  || — || December 30, 2000 || Socorro || LINEAR || EOS || align=right | 4.0 km || 
|-id=093 bgcolor=#d6d6d6
| 94093 ||  || — || December 30, 2000 || Socorro || LINEAR || — || align=right | 6.8 km || 
|-id=094 bgcolor=#d6d6d6
| 94094 ||  || — || December 16, 2000 || Kitt Peak || Spacewatch || EOS || align=right | 5.7 km || 
|-id=095 bgcolor=#E9E9E9
| 94095 ||  || — || December 28, 2000 || Socorro || LINEAR || — || align=right | 4.0 km || 
|-id=096 bgcolor=#E9E9E9
| 94096 ||  || — || December 30, 2000 || Socorro || LINEAR || — || align=right | 2.7 km || 
|-id=097 bgcolor=#d6d6d6
| 94097 ||  || — || December 30, 2000 || Socorro || LINEAR || KOR || align=right | 4.3 km || 
|-id=098 bgcolor=#d6d6d6
| 94098 ||  || — || December 30, 2000 || Socorro || LINEAR || KOR || align=right | 4.1 km || 
|-id=099 bgcolor=#E9E9E9
| 94099 ||  || — || December 30, 2000 || Socorro || LINEAR || — || align=right | 4.0 km || 
|-id=100 bgcolor=#d6d6d6
| 94100 ||  || — || December 30, 2000 || Socorro || LINEAR || — || align=right | 9.1 km || 
|}

94101–94200 

|-bgcolor=#d6d6d6
| 94101 ||  || — || December 30, 2000 || Socorro || LINEAR || — || align=right | 9.2 km || 
|-id=102 bgcolor=#d6d6d6
| 94102 ||  || — || December 30, 2000 || Socorro || LINEAR || — || align=right | 5.7 km || 
|-id=103 bgcolor=#E9E9E9
| 94103 ||  || — || December 30, 2000 || Socorro || LINEAR || PAD || align=right | 3.4 km || 
|-id=104 bgcolor=#d6d6d6
| 94104 ||  || — || December 30, 2000 || Socorro || LINEAR || — || align=right | 6.6 km || 
|-id=105 bgcolor=#E9E9E9
| 94105 ||  || — || December 30, 2000 || Socorro || LINEAR || — || align=right | 3.1 km || 
|-id=106 bgcolor=#d6d6d6
| 94106 ||  || — || December 30, 2000 || Socorro || LINEAR || — || align=right | 7.5 km || 
|-id=107 bgcolor=#d6d6d6
| 94107 ||  || — || December 30, 2000 || Socorro || LINEAR || TIR || align=right | 11 km || 
|-id=108 bgcolor=#d6d6d6
| 94108 ||  || — || December 30, 2000 || Socorro || LINEAR || — || align=right | 7.5 km || 
|-id=109 bgcolor=#d6d6d6
| 94109 ||  || — || December 30, 2000 || Socorro || LINEAR || — || align=right | 7.2 km || 
|-id=110 bgcolor=#E9E9E9
| 94110 ||  || — || December 30, 2000 || Socorro || LINEAR || — || align=right | 2.7 km || 
|-id=111 bgcolor=#E9E9E9
| 94111 ||  || — || December 30, 2000 || Socorro || LINEAR || — || align=right | 2.7 km || 
|-id=112 bgcolor=#d6d6d6
| 94112 ||  || — || December 30, 2000 || Socorro || LINEAR || — || align=right | 6.2 km || 
|-id=113 bgcolor=#d6d6d6
| 94113 ||  || — || December 30, 2000 || Socorro || LINEAR || — || align=right | 6.2 km || 
|-id=114 bgcolor=#d6d6d6
| 94114 ||  || — || December 30, 2000 || Socorro || LINEAR || — || align=right | 5.9 km || 
|-id=115 bgcolor=#d6d6d6
| 94115 ||  || — || December 30, 2000 || Socorro || LINEAR || — || align=right | 8.0 km || 
|-id=116 bgcolor=#d6d6d6
| 94116 ||  || — || December 28, 2000 || Socorro || LINEAR || — || align=right | 5.6 km || 
|-id=117 bgcolor=#E9E9E9
| 94117 ||  || — || December 28, 2000 || Socorro || LINEAR || — || align=right | 2.7 km || 
|-id=118 bgcolor=#E9E9E9
| 94118 ||  || — || December 28, 2000 || Socorro || LINEAR || — || align=right | 4.9 km || 
|-id=119 bgcolor=#E9E9E9
| 94119 ||  || — || December 28, 2000 || Socorro || LINEAR || — || align=right | 2.7 km || 
|-id=120 bgcolor=#E9E9E9
| 94120 ||  || — || December 30, 2000 || Socorro || LINEAR || — || align=right | 6.6 km || 
|-id=121 bgcolor=#E9E9E9
| 94121 ||  || — || December 30, 2000 || Socorro || LINEAR || — || align=right | 6.5 km || 
|-id=122 bgcolor=#E9E9E9
| 94122 ||  || — || December 30, 2000 || Socorro || LINEAR || — || align=right | 4.1 km || 
|-id=123 bgcolor=#E9E9E9
| 94123 ||  || — || December 30, 2000 || Socorro || LINEAR || — || align=right | 4.2 km || 
|-id=124 bgcolor=#d6d6d6
| 94124 ||  || — || December 30, 2000 || Socorro || LINEAR || — || align=right | 5.4 km || 
|-id=125 bgcolor=#E9E9E9
| 94125 ||  || — || December 30, 2000 || Socorro || LINEAR || — || align=right | 2.6 km || 
|-id=126 bgcolor=#d6d6d6
| 94126 ||  || — || December 30, 2000 || Socorro || LINEAR || — || align=right | 6.7 km || 
|-id=127 bgcolor=#d6d6d6
| 94127 ||  || — || December 30, 2000 || Socorro || LINEAR || — || align=right | 9.2 km || 
|-id=128 bgcolor=#d6d6d6
| 94128 ||  || — || December 30, 2000 || Socorro || LINEAR || — || align=right | 5.7 km || 
|-id=129 bgcolor=#E9E9E9
| 94129 ||  || — || December 30, 2000 || Socorro || LINEAR || — || align=right | 6.8 km || 
|-id=130 bgcolor=#d6d6d6
| 94130 ||  || — || December 30, 2000 || Socorro || LINEAR || — || align=right | 5.1 km || 
|-id=131 bgcolor=#d6d6d6
| 94131 ||  || — || December 30, 2000 || Socorro || LINEAR || — || align=right | 6.8 km || 
|-id=132 bgcolor=#d6d6d6
| 94132 ||  || — || December 30, 2000 || Socorro || LINEAR || — || align=right | 7.2 km || 
|-id=133 bgcolor=#d6d6d6
| 94133 ||  || — || December 30, 2000 || Socorro || LINEAR || — || align=right | 8.0 km || 
|-id=134 bgcolor=#d6d6d6
| 94134 ||  || — || December 30, 2000 || Socorro || LINEAR || — || align=right | 4.7 km || 
|-id=135 bgcolor=#E9E9E9
| 94135 ||  || — || December 30, 2000 || Anderson Mesa || LONEOS || EUN || align=right | 2.6 km || 
|-id=136 bgcolor=#E9E9E9
| 94136 ||  || — || December 28, 2000 || Socorro || LINEAR || BRU || align=right | 8.8 km || 
|-id=137 bgcolor=#E9E9E9
| 94137 ||  || — || December 29, 2000 || Anderson Mesa || LONEOS || — || align=right | 2.9 km || 
|-id=138 bgcolor=#E9E9E9
| 94138 ||  || — || December 30, 2000 || Socorro || LINEAR || NEM || align=right | 5.1 km || 
|-id=139 bgcolor=#d6d6d6
| 94139 ||  || — || December 30, 2000 || Socorro || LINEAR || — || align=right | 5.3 km || 
|-id=140 bgcolor=#E9E9E9
| 94140 ||  || — || December 31, 2000 || Haleakala || NEAT || — || align=right | 3.6 km || 
|-id=141 bgcolor=#E9E9E9
| 94141 ||  || — || December 17, 2000 || Anderson Mesa || LONEOS || — || align=right | 5.8 km || 
|-id=142 bgcolor=#d6d6d6
| 94142 ||  || — || December 23, 2000 || Kitt Peak || Spacewatch || KOR || align=right | 2.7 km || 
|-id=143 bgcolor=#E9E9E9
| 94143 ||  || — || December 27, 2000 || Anderson Mesa || LONEOS || POS || align=right | 7.3 km || 
|-id=144 bgcolor=#d6d6d6
| 94144 ||  || — || December 27, 2000 || Anderson Mesa || LONEOS || TIR || align=right | 5.2 km || 
|-id=145 bgcolor=#E9E9E9
| 94145 ||  || — || December 20, 2000 || Socorro || LINEAR || — || align=right | 4.4 km || 
|-id=146 bgcolor=#d6d6d6
| 94146 ||  || — || January 2, 2001 || Kitt Peak || Spacewatch || — || align=right | 5.5 km || 
|-id=147 bgcolor=#E9E9E9
| 94147 ||  || — || January 2, 2001 || Socorro || LINEAR || — || align=right | 4.7 km || 
|-id=148 bgcolor=#E9E9E9
| 94148 ||  || — || January 2, 2001 || Socorro || LINEAR || — || align=right | 7.2 km || 
|-id=149 bgcolor=#E9E9E9
| 94149 ||  || — || January 2, 2001 || Socorro || LINEAR || — || align=right | 3.1 km || 
|-id=150 bgcolor=#E9E9E9
| 94150 ||  || — || January 2, 2001 || Socorro || LINEAR || DOR || align=right | 6.1 km || 
|-id=151 bgcolor=#E9E9E9
| 94151 ||  || — || January 2, 2001 || Socorro || LINEAR || — || align=right | 4.0 km || 
|-id=152 bgcolor=#E9E9E9
| 94152 ||  || — || January 2, 2001 || Socorro || LINEAR || — || align=right | 2.9 km || 
|-id=153 bgcolor=#d6d6d6
| 94153 ||  || — || January 2, 2001 || Socorro || LINEAR || KOR || align=right | 2.9 km || 
|-id=154 bgcolor=#d6d6d6
| 94154 ||  || — || January 2, 2001 || Socorro || LINEAR || — || align=right | 7.2 km || 
|-id=155 bgcolor=#d6d6d6
| 94155 ||  || — || January 2, 2001 || Socorro || LINEAR || EMA || align=right | 7.2 km || 
|-id=156 bgcolor=#E9E9E9
| 94156 ||  || — || January 2, 2001 || Socorro || LINEAR || — || align=right | 5.2 km || 
|-id=157 bgcolor=#d6d6d6
| 94157 ||  || — || January 2, 2001 || Socorro || LINEAR || — || align=right | 8.7 km || 
|-id=158 bgcolor=#d6d6d6
| 94158 ||  || — || January 2, 2001 || Socorro || LINEAR || — || align=right | 7.0 km || 
|-id=159 bgcolor=#E9E9E9
| 94159 ||  || — || January 2, 2001 || Socorro || LINEAR || — || align=right | 3.1 km || 
|-id=160 bgcolor=#d6d6d6
| 94160 ||  || — || January 2, 2001 || Socorro || LINEAR || — || align=right | 6.9 km || 
|-id=161 bgcolor=#d6d6d6
| 94161 ||  || — || January 2, 2001 || Socorro || LINEAR || — || align=right | 5.4 km || 
|-id=162 bgcolor=#E9E9E9
| 94162 ||  || — || January 2, 2001 || Socorro || LINEAR || — || align=right | 2.8 km || 
|-id=163 bgcolor=#E9E9E9
| 94163 ||  || — || January 3, 2001 || Socorro || LINEAR || EUN || align=right | 3.0 km || 
|-id=164 bgcolor=#d6d6d6
| 94164 ||  || — || January 3, 2001 || Socorro || LINEAR || — || align=right | 7.2 km || 
|-id=165 bgcolor=#E9E9E9
| 94165 ||  || — || January 3, 2001 || Socorro || LINEAR || — || align=right | 4.7 km || 
|-id=166 bgcolor=#d6d6d6
| 94166 ||  || — || January 3, 2001 || Socorro || LINEAR || EOS || align=right | 4.8 km || 
|-id=167 bgcolor=#d6d6d6
| 94167 ||  || — || January 3, 2001 || Socorro || LINEAR || VER || align=right | 7.3 km || 
|-id=168 bgcolor=#d6d6d6
| 94168 ||  || — || January 3, 2001 || Socorro || LINEAR || EOS || align=right | 3.5 km || 
|-id=169 bgcolor=#E9E9E9
| 94169 ||  || — || January 5, 2001 || Socorro || LINEAR || — || align=right | 3.6 km || 
|-id=170 bgcolor=#E9E9E9
| 94170 ||  || — || January 5, 2001 || Socorro || LINEAR || — || align=right | 3.9 km || 
|-id=171 bgcolor=#d6d6d6
| 94171 ||  || — || January 5, 2001 || Socorro || LINEAR || — || align=right | 10 km || 
|-id=172 bgcolor=#d6d6d6
| 94172 ||  || — || January 4, 2001 || Socorro || LINEAR || 628 || align=right | 4.2 km || 
|-id=173 bgcolor=#E9E9E9
| 94173 ||  || — || January 4, 2001 || Socorro || LINEAR || HNS || align=right | 4.2 km || 
|-id=174 bgcolor=#d6d6d6
| 94174 ||  || — || January 4, 2001 || Socorro || LINEAR || — || align=right | 8.6 km || 
|-id=175 bgcolor=#d6d6d6
| 94175 ||  || — || January 4, 2001 || Socorro || LINEAR || EOS || align=right | 3.8 km || 
|-id=176 bgcolor=#d6d6d6
| 94176 ||  || — || January 4, 2001 || Socorro || LINEAR || EOS || align=right | 5.0 km || 
|-id=177 bgcolor=#d6d6d6
| 94177 ||  || — || January 4, 2001 || Socorro || LINEAR || — || align=right | 7.1 km || 
|-id=178 bgcolor=#d6d6d6
| 94178 ||  || — || January 4, 2001 || Socorro || LINEAR || — || align=right | 5.4 km || 
|-id=179 bgcolor=#d6d6d6
| 94179 ||  || — || January 4, 2001 || Socorro || LINEAR || — || align=right | 8.2 km || 
|-id=180 bgcolor=#E9E9E9
| 94180 ||  || — || January 5, 2001 || Socorro || LINEAR || — || align=right | 3.2 km || 
|-id=181 bgcolor=#d6d6d6
| 94181 ||  || — || January 5, 2001 || Socorro || LINEAR || — || align=right | 7.6 km || 
|-id=182 bgcolor=#E9E9E9
| 94182 ||  || — || January 5, 2001 || Socorro || LINEAR || EUN || align=right | 3.7 km || 
|-id=183 bgcolor=#d6d6d6
| 94183 ||  || — || January 2, 2001 || Socorro || LINEAR || KOR || align=right | 2.7 km || 
|-id=184 bgcolor=#d6d6d6
| 94184 ||  || — || January 4, 2001 || Anderson Mesa || LONEOS || — || align=right | 8.3 km || 
|-id=185 bgcolor=#d6d6d6
| 94185 ||  || — || January 4, 2001 || Anderson Mesa || LONEOS || URS || align=right | 7.5 km || 
|-id=186 bgcolor=#d6d6d6
| 94186 ||  || — || January 15, 2001 || Kleť || Kleť Obs. || — || align=right | 7.9 km || 
|-id=187 bgcolor=#d6d6d6
| 94187 ||  || — || January 2, 2001 || Anderson Mesa || LONEOS || EUP || align=right | 11 km || 
|-id=188 bgcolor=#d6d6d6
| 94188 ||  || — || January 3, 2001 || Anderson Mesa || LONEOS || — || align=right | 6.3 km || 
|-id=189 bgcolor=#d6d6d6
| 94189 || 2001 BU || — || January 17, 2001 || Oizumi || T. Kobayashi || — || align=right | 7.6 km || 
|-id=190 bgcolor=#d6d6d6
| 94190 || 2001 BY || — || January 17, 2001 || Oizumi || T. Kobayashi || — || align=right | 5.7 km || 
|-id=191 bgcolor=#E9E9E9
| 94191 ||  || — || January 17, 2001 || Socorro || LINEAR || — || align=right | 3.5 km || 
|-id=192 bgcolor=#E9E9E9
| 94192 ||  || — || January 19, 2001 || Socorro || LINEAR || — || align=right | 5.0 km || 
|-id=193 bgcolor=#d6d6d6
| 94193 ||  || — || January 19, 2001 || Socorro || LINEAR || — || align=right | 7.0 km || 
|-id=194 bgcolor=#d6d6d6
| 94194 ||  || — || January 19, 2001 || Socorro || LINEAR || KOR || align=right | 3.2 km || 
|-id=195 bgcolor=#d6d6d6
| 94195 ||  || — || January 22, 2001 || Oaxaca || J. M. Roe || — || align=right | 6.9 km || 
|-id=196 bgcolor=#d6d6d6
| 94196 ||  || — || January 21, 2001 || Oizumi || T. Kobayashi || — || align=right | 6.3 km || 
|-id=197 bgcolor=#d6d6d6
| 94197 ||  || — || January 21, 2001 || Oizumi || T. Kobayashi || — || align=right | 7.1 km || 
|-id=198 bgcolor=#d6d6d6
| 94198 ||  || — || January 21, 2001 || Oizumi || T. Kobayashi || — || align=right | 9.0 km || 
|-id=199 bgcolor=#d6d6d6
| 94199 ||  || — || January 18, 2001 || Socorro || LINEAR || — || align=right | 4.8 km || 
|-id=200 bgcolor=#E9E9E9
| 94200 ||  || — || January 19, 2001 || Socorro || LINEAR || — || align=right | 3.2 km || 
|}

94201–94300 

|-bgcolor=#d6d6d6
| 94201 ||  || — || January 19, 2001 || Socorro || LINEAR || — || align=right | 4.8 km || 
|-id=202 bgcolor=#d6d6d6
| 94202 ||  || — || January 19, 2001 || Socorro || LINEAR || — || align=right | 6.8 km || 
|-id=203 bgcolor=#d6d6d6
| 94203 ||  || — || January 20, 2001 || Socorro || LINEAR || — || align=right | 5.1 km || 
|-id=204 bgcolor=#d6d6d6
| 94204 ||  || — || January 20, 2001 || Socorro || LINEAR || — || align=right | 7.4 km || 
|-id=205 bgcolor=#E9E9E9
| 94205 ||  || — || January 20, 2001 || Socorro || LINEAR || — || align=right | 3.9 km || 
|-id=206 bgcolor=#d6d6d6
| 94206 ||  || — || January 20, 2001 || Socorro || LINEAR || — || align=right | 6.4 km || 
|-id=207 bgcolor=#d6d6d6
| 94207 ||  || — || January 20, 2001 || Socorro || LINEAR || EOS || align=right | 4.0 km || 
|-id=208 bgcolor=#d6d6d6
| 94208 ||  || — || January 20, 2001 || Socorro || LINEAR || THM || align=right | 4.6 km || 
|-id=209 bgcolor=#d6d6d6
| 94209 ||  || — || January 20, 2001 || Socorro || LINEAR || URS || align=right | 14 km || 
|-id=210 bgcolor=#FA8072
| 94210 ||  || — || January 20, 2001 || Socorro || LINEAR || — || align=right | 2.0 km || 
|-id=211 bgcolor=#d6d6d6
| 94211 ||  || — || January 20, 2001 || Socorro || LINEAR || EOS || align=right | 5.5 km || 
|-id=212 bgcolor=#d6d6d6
| 94212 ||  || — || January 20, 2001 || Socorro || LINEAR || EOS || align=right | 4.4 km || 
|-id=213 bgcolor=#d6d6d6
| 94213 ||  || — || January 23, 2001 || Oaxaca || J. M. Roe || — || align=right | 6.2 km || 
|-id=214 bgcolor=#d6d6d6
| 94214 ||  || — || January 18, 2001 || Socorro || LINEAR || — || align=right | 7.1 km || 
|-id=215 bgcolor=#E9E9E9
| 94215 ||  || — || January 19, 2001 || Socorro || LINEAR || — || align=right | 3.4 km || 
|-id=216 bgcolor=#E9E9E9
| 94216 ||  || — || January 19, 2001 || Socorro || LINEAR || — || align=right | 2.8 km || 
|-id=217 bgcolor=#d6d6d6
| 94217 ||  || — || January 19, 2001 || Socorro || LINEAR || — || align=right | 6.2 km || 
|-id=218 bgcolor=#d6d6d6
| 94218 ||  || — || January 20, 2001 || Socorro || LINEAR || EUP || align=right | 10 km || 
|-id=219 bgcolor=#d6d6d6
| 94219 ||  || — || January 21, 2001 || Socorro || LINEAR || EUP || align=right | 9.0 km || 
|-id=220 bgcolor=#d6d6d6
| 94220 ||  || — || January 21, 2001 || Socorro || LINEAR || — || align=right | 6.8 km || 
|-id=221 bgcolor=#d6d6d6
| 94221 ||  || — || January 21, 2001 || Socorro || LINEAR || EOS || align=right | 3.2 km || 
|-id=222 bgcolor=#d6d6d6
| 94222 ||  || — || January 21, 2001 || Socorro || LINEAR || — || align=right | 4.8 km || 
|-id=223 bgcolor=#d6d6d6
| 94223 ||  || — || January 17, 2001 || Calar Alto || Calar Alto Obs. || — || align=right | 4.8 km || 
|-id=224 bgcolor=#E9E9E9
| 94224 ||  || — || January 19, 2001 || Haleakala || NEAT || — || align=right | 3.2 km || 
|-id=225 bgcolor=#d6d6d6
| 94225 ||  || — || January 26, 2001 || Socorro || LINEAR || EUP || align=right | 8.4 km || 
|-id=226 bgcolor=#E9E9E9
| 94226 ||  || — || January 26, 2001 || Socorro || LINEAR || — || align=right | 7.9 km || 
|-id=227 bgcolor=#d6d6d6
| 94227 ||  || — || January 26, 2001 || Haleakala || NEAT || — || align=right | 8.4 km || 
|-id=228 bgcolor=#E9E9E9
| 94228 Leesuikwan ||  ||  || January 31, 2001 || Desert Beaver || W. K. Y. Yeung || HNS || align=right | 4.8 km || 
|-id=229 bgcolor=#E9E9E9
| 94229 ||  || — || January 29, 2001 || Socorro || LINEAR || GEF || align=right | 3.1 km || 
|-id=230 bgcolor=#d6d6d6
| 94230 ||  || — || January 29, 2001 || Socorro || LINEAR || 7:4 || align=right | 12 km || 
|-id=231 bgcolor=#d6d6d6
| 94231 ||  || — || January 26, 2001 || Socorro || LINEAR || — || align=right | 8.8 km || 
|-id=232 bgcolor=#d6d6d6
| 94232 ||  || — || January 30, 2001 || Socorro || LINEAR || — || align=right | 7.3 km || 
|-id=233 bgcolor=#d6d6d6
| 94233 ||  || — || January 31, 2001 || Socorro || LINEAR || — || align=right | 4.4 km || 
|-id=234 bgcolor=#E9E9E9
| 94234 ||  || — || January 31, 2001 || Kitt Peak || Spacewatch || ADE || align=right | 5.9 km || 
|-id=235 bgcolor=#d6d6d6
| 94235 ||  || — || January 31, 2001 || Socorro || LINEAR || — || align=right | 6.4 km || 
|-id=236 bgcolor=#d6d6d6
| 94236 ||  || — || January 26, 2001 || Socorro || LINEAR || — || align=right | 4.2 km || 
|-id=237 bgcolor=#E9E9E9
| 94237 ||  || — || January 24, 2001 || Socorro || LINEAR || — || align=right | 3.5 km || 
|-id=238 bgcolor=#d6d6d6
| 94238 ||  || — || February 1, 2001 || Socorro || LINEAR || THM || align=right | 5.4 km || 
|-id=239 bgcolor=#d6d6d6
| 94239 ||  || — || February 1, 2001 || Socorro || LINEAR || — || align=right | 8.5 km || 
|-id=240 bgcolor=#d6d6d6
| 94240 ||  || — || February 1, 2001 || Socorro || LINEAR || — || align=right | 5.4 km || 
|-id=241 bgcolor=#d6d6d6
| 94241 ||  || — || February 1, 2001 || Socorro || LINEAR || — || align=right | 6.7 km || 
|-id=242 bgcolor=#d6d6d6
| 94242 ||  || — || February 1, 2001 || Socorro || LINEAR || — || align=right | 8.4 km || 
|-id=243 bgcolor=#d6d6d6
| 94243 ||  || — || February 3, 2001 || Piera || J. Guarro i Fló || — || align=right | 9.9 km || 
|-id=244 bgcolor=#d6d6d6
| 94244 ||  || — || February 1, 2001 || Socorro || LINEAR || — || align=right | 6.5 km || 
|-id=245 bgcolor=#d6d6d6
| 94245 ||  || — || February 1, 2001 || Socorro || LINEAR || — || align=right | 6.3 km || 
|-id=246 bgcolor=#d6d6d6
| 94246 ||  || — || February 1, 2001 || Socorro || LINEAR || SYL7:4 || align=right | 9.9 km || 
|-id=247 bgcolor=#d6d6d6
| 94247 ||  || — || February 2, 2001 || Socorro || LINEAR || — || align=right | 4.7 km || 
|-id=248 bgcolor=#d6d6d6
| 94248 ||  || — || February 1, 2001 || Anderson Mesa || LONEOS || — || align=right | 7.3 km || 
|-id=249 bgcolor=#d6d6d6
| 94249 ||  || — || February 1, 2001 || Anderson Mesa || LONEOS || — || align=right | 5.9 km || 
|-id=250 bgcolor=#d6d6d6
| 94250 ||  || — || February 1, 2001 || Haleakala || NEAT || — || align=right | 7.9 km || 
|-id=251 bgcolor=#d6d6d6
| 94251 ||  || — || February 2, 2001 || Anderson Mesa || LONEOS || — || align=right | 11 km || 
|-id=252 bgcolor=#d6d6d6
| 94252 ||  || — || February 2, 2001 || Anderson Mesa || LONEOS || — || align=right | 8.5 km || 
|-id=253 bgcolor=#d6d6d6
| 94253 ||  || — || February 2, 2001 || Anderson Mesa || LONEOS || — || align=right | 8.6 km || 
|-id=254 bgcolor=#d6d6d6
| 94254 ||  || — || February 2, 2001 || Anderson Mesa || LONEOS || — || align=right | 5.4 km || 
|-id=255 bgcolor=#E9E9E9
| 94255 ||  || — || February 2, 2001 || Haleakala || NEAT || — || align=right | 3.6 km || 
|-id=256 bgcolor=#d6d6d6
| 94256 ||  || — || February 13, 2001 || Socorro || LINEAR || DUR || align=right | 7.5 km || 
|-id=257 bgcolor=#d6d6d6
| 94257 ||  || — || February 13, 2001 || Socorro || LINEAR || ALA || align=right | 8.0 km || 
|-id=258 bgcolor=#d6d6d6
| 94258 ||  || — || February 14, 2001 || Ondřejov || L. Kotková || — || align=right | 5.9 km || 
|-id=259 bgcolor=#E9E9E9
| 94259 ||  || — || February 13, 2001 || Socorro || LINEAR || EUN || align=right | 2.9 km || 
|-id=260 bgcolor=#d6d6d6
| 94260 ||  || — || February 13, 2001 || Socorro || LINEAR || — || align=right | 8.7 km || 
|-id=261 bgcolor=#d6d6d6
| 94261 ||  || — || February 13, 2001 || Socorro || LINEAR || — || align=right | 10 km || 
|-id=262 bgcolor=#E9E9E9
| 94262 ||  || — || February 15, 2001 || Socorro || LINEAR || — || align=right | 3.6 km || 
|-id=263 bgcolor=#d6d6d6
| 94263 ||  || — || February 15, 2001 || Socorro || LINEAR || EUP || align=right | 8.7 km || 
|-id=264 bgcolor=#d6d6d6
| 94264 ||  || — || February 15, 2001 || Socorro || LINEAR || URS || align=right | 7.6 km || 
|-id=265 bgcolor=#d6d6d6
| 94265 ||  || — || February 15, 2001 || Socorro || LINEAR || ALA || align=right | 8.7 km || 
|-id=266 bgcolor=#d6d6d6
| 94266 || 2001 DO || — || February 16, 2001 || Ondřejov || P. Pravec, L. Kotková || HIL3:2 || align=right | 11 km || 
|-id=267 bgcolor=#d6d6d6
| 94267 ||  || — || February 16, 2001 || Socorro || LINEAR || — || align=right | 6.1 km || 
|-id=268 bgcolor=#d6d6d6
| 94268 ||  || — || February 17, 2001 || Socorro || LINEAR || VER || align=right | 5.0 km || 
|-id=269 bgcolor=#d6d6d6
| 94269 ||  || — || February 16, 2001 || Socorro || LINEAR || — || align=right | 10 km || 
|-id=270 bgcolor=#d6d6d6
| 94270 ||  || — || February 16, 2001 || Socorro || LINEAR || — || align=right | 8.0 km || 
|-id=271 bgcolor=#d6d6d6
| 94271 ||  || — || February 16, 2001 || Socorro || LINEAR || — || align=right | 8.6 km || 
|-id=272 bgcolor=#d6d6d6
| 94272 ||  || — || February 17, 2001 || Socorro || LINEAR || THM || align=right | 4.8 km || 
|-id=273 bgcolor=#d6d6d6
| 94273 ||  || — || February 17, 2001 || Socorro || LINEAR || — || align=right | 6.9 km || 
|-id=274 bgcolor=#d6d6d6
| 94274 ||  || — || February 17, 2001 || Socorro || LINEAR || — || align=right | 6.6 km || 
|-id=275 bgcolor=#d6d6d6
| 94275 ||  || — || February 19, 2001 || Socorro || LINEAR || HIL3:2 || align=right | 13 km || 
|-id=276 bgcolor=#d6d6d6
| 94276 ||  || — || February 19, 2001 || Socorro || LINEAR || VER || align=right | 8.5 km || 
|-id=277 bgcolor=#d6d6d6
| 94277 ||  || — || February 19, 2001 || Socorro || LINEAR || THM || align=right | 4.6 km || 
|-id=278 bgcolor=#d6d6d6
| 94278 ||  || — || February 19, 2001 || Socorro || LINEAR || SYL7:4 || align=right | 7.6 km || 
|-id=279 bgcolor=#d6d6d6
| 94279 ||  || — || February 19, 2001 || Socorro || LINEAR || EOS || align=right | 4.2 km || 
|-id=280 bgcolor=#d6d6d6
| 94280 ||  || — || February 19, 2001 || Socorro || LINEAR || — || align=right | 5.4 km || 
|-id=281 bgcolor=#d6d6d6
| 94281 ||  || — || February 19, 2001 || Socorro || LINEAR || VER || align=right | 6.7 km || 
|-id=282 bgcolor=#d6d6d6
| 94282 ||  || — || February 19, 2001 || Socorro || LINEAR || MEL || align=right | 8.8 km || 
|-id=283 bgcolor=#d6d6d6
| 94283 ||  || — || February 16, 2001 || Socorro || LINEAR || EOS || align=right | 4.7 km || 
|-id=284 bgcolor=#d6d6d6
| 94284 ||  || — || February 16, 2001 || Socorro || LINEAR || EOS || align=right | 5.8 km || 
|-id=285 bgcolor=#d6d6d6
| 94285 ||  || — || February 16, 2001 || Socorro || LINEAR || VER || align=right | 5.7 km || 
|-id=286 bgcolor=#d6d6d6
| 94286 ||  || — || February 17, 2001 || Haleakala || NEAT || — || align=right | 7.6 km || 
|-id=287 bgcolor=#d6d6d6
| 94287 ||  || — || February 19, 2001 || Socorro || LINEAR || — || align=right | 7.0 km || 
|-id=288 bgcolor=#E9E9E9
| 94288 ||  || — || February 19, 2001 || Socorro || LINEAR || — || align=right | 4.3 km || 
|-id=289 bgcolor=#d6d6d6
| 94289 ||  || — || February 19, 2001 || Socorro || LINEAR || — || align=right | 6.8 km || 
|-id=290 bgcolor=#E9E9E9
| 94290 ||  || — || February 20, 2001 || Haleakala || NEAT || IAN || align=right | 2.2 km || 
|-id=291 bgcolor=#d6d6d6
| 94291 Django ||  ||  || February 28, 2001 || Badlands || R. Dyvig || — || align=right | 5.0 km || 
|-id=292 bgcolor=#d6d6d6
| 94292 ||  || — || February 18, 2001 || Haleakala || NEAT || ALA || align=right | 6.0 km || 
|-id=293 bgcolor=#d6d6d6
| 94293 ||  || — || February 17, 2001 || Socorro || LINEAR || — || align=right | 6.4 km || 
|-id=294 bgcolor=#d6d6d6
| 94294 ||  || — || February 17, 2001 || Socorro || LINEAR || EOS || align=right | 3.4 km || 
|-id=295 bgcolor=#d6d6d6
| 94295 ||  || — || February 17, 2001 || Socorro || LINEAR || EOS || align=right | 3.7 km || 
|-id=296 bgcolor=#d6d6d6
| 94296 ||  || — || February 16, 2001 || Socorro || LINEAR || VER || align=right | 4.4 km || 
|-id=297 bgcolor=#d6d6d6
| 94297 ||  || — || February 16, 2001 || Kitt Peak || Spacewatch || THM || align=right | 5.1 km || 
|-id=298 bgcolor=#d6d6d6
| 94298 ||  || — || February 16, 2001 || Anderson Mesa || LONEOS || EMA || align=right | 7.0 km || 
|-id=299 bgcolor=#d6d6d6
| 94299 ||  || — || February 16, 2001 || Anderson Mesa || LONEOS || 3:2 || align=right | 11 km || 
|-id=300 bgcolor=#d6d6d6
| 94300 ||  || — || March 1, 2001 || Socorro || LINEAR || — || align=right | 7.3 km || 
|}

94301–94400 

|-bgcolor=#d6d6d6
| 94301 ||  || — || March 2, 2001 || Anderson Mesa || LONEOS || 7:4 || align=right | 7.5 km || 
|-id=302 bgcolor=#d6d6d6
| 94302 ||  || — || March 15, 2001 || Oizumi || T. Kobayashi || — || align=right | 10 km || 
|-id=303 bgcolor=#d6d6d6
| 94303 ||  || — || March 15, 2001 || Socorro || LINEAR || — || align=right | 12 km || 
|-id=304 bgcolor=#d6d6d6
| 94304 ||  || — || March 13, 2001 || Anderson Mesa || LONEOS || — || align=right | 6.7 km || 
|-id=305 bgcolor=#d6d6d6
| 94305 ||  || — || March 18, 2001 || Socorro || LINEAR || — || align=right | 6.9 km || 
|-id=306 bgcolor=#d6d6d6
| 94306 ||  || — || March 19, 2001 || Anderson Mesa || LONEOS || — || align=right | 9.0 km || 
|-id=307 bgcolor=#d6d6d6
| 94307 ||  || — || March 19, 2001 || Anderson Mesa || LONEOS || — || align=right | 6.4 km || 
|-id=308 bgcolor=#d6d6d6
| 94308 ||  || — || March 19, 2001 || Anderson Mesa || LONEOS || 7:4 || align=right | 7.4 km || 
|-id=309 bgcolor=#d6d6d6
| 94309 ||  || — || March 18, 2001 || Socorro || LINEAR || — || align=right | 8.8 km || 
|-id=310 bgcolor=#E9E9E9
| 94310 ||  || — || March 18, 2001 || Socorro || LINEAR || INO || align=right | 2.7 km || 
|-id=311 bgcolor=#d6d6d6
| 94311 ||  || — || March 18, 2001 || Socorro || LINEAR || — || align=right | 6.8 km || 
|-id=312 bgcolor=#d6d6d6
| 94312 ||  || — || March 18, 2001 || Socorro || LINEAR || — || align=right | 11 km || 
|-id=313 bgcolor=#d6d6d6
| 94313 ||  || — || March 18, 2001 || Socorro || LINEAR || EUP || align=right | 12 km || 
|-id=314 bgcolor=#d6d6d6
| 94314 ||  || — || March 18, 2001 || Socorro || LINEAR || TIR || align=right | 6.8 km || 
|-id=315 bgcolor=#d6d6d6
| 94315 ||  || — || March 19, 2001 || Socorro || LINEAR || — || align=right | 6.1 km || 
|-id=316 bgcolor=#d6d6d6
| 94316 ||  || — || March 19, 2001 || Socorro || LINEAR || — || align=right | 13 km || 
|-id=317 bgcolor=#d6d6d6
| 94317 ||  || — || March 19, 2001 || Socorro || LINEAR || — || align=right | 7.2 km || 
|-id=318 bgcolor=#d6d6d6
| 94318 ||  || — || March 16, 2001 || Socorro || LINEAR || — || align=right | 8.1 km || 
|-id=319 bgcolor=#d6d6d6
| 94319 ||  || — || March 17, 2001 || Prescott || P. G. Comba || — || align=right | 4.7 km || 
|-id=320 bgcolor=#d6d6d6
| 94320 ||  || — || March 18, 2001 || Socorro || LINEAR || HYG || align=right | 7.9 km || 
|-id=321 bgcolor=#d6d6d6
| 94321 ||  || — || March 18, 2001 || Socorro || LINEAR || HYG || align=right | 5.7 km || 
|-id=322 bgcolor=#d6d6d6
| 94322 ||  || — || March 18, 2001 || Socorro || LINEAR || — || align=right | 6.3 km || 
|-id=323 bgcolor=#d6d6d6
| 94323 ||  || — || March 27, 2001 || Haleakala || NEAT || EOS || align=right | 4.6 km || 
|-id=324 bgcolor=#d6d6d6
| 94324 ||  || — || March 26, 2001 || Socorro || LINEAR || 7:4 || align=right | 6.8 km || 
|-id=325 bgcolor=#d6d6d6
| 94325 ||  || — || March 21, 2001 || Haleakala || NEAT || — || align=right | 6.6 km || 
|-id=326 bgcolor=#d6d6d6
| 94326 ||  || — || March 21, 2001 || Haleakala || NEAT || TIR || align=right | 7.1 km || 
|-id=327 bgcolor=#d6d6d6
| 94327 ||  || — || March 21, 2001 || Haleakala || NEAT || HYG || align=right | 7.7 km || 
|-id=328 bgcolor=#d6d6d6
| 94328 ||  || — || March 26, 2001 || Socorro || LINEAR || HYG || align=right | 6.5 km || 
|-id=329 bgcolor=#d6d6d6
| 94329 ||  || — || March 26, 2001 || Haleakala || NEAT || THM || align=right | 5.7 km || 
|-id=330 bgcolor=#d6d6d6
| 94330 ||  || — || March 18, 2001 || Socorro || LINEAR || VER || align=right | 5.4 km || 
|-id=331 bgcolor=#d6d6d6
| 94331 ||  || — || March 18, 2001 || Socorro || LINEAR || — || align=right | 6.9 km || 
|-id=332 bgcolor=#fefefe
| 94332 || 2001 KF || — || May 16, 2001 || Socorro || LINEAR || H || align=right | 1.3 km || 
|-id=333 bgcolor=#d6d6d6
| 94333 ||  || — || May 18, 2001 || Anderson Mesa || LONEOS || ALA || align=right | 9.2 km || 
|-id=334 bgcolor=#fefefe
| 94334 ||  || — || July 21, 2001 || Anderson Mesa || LONEOS || H || align=right | 1.6 km || 
|-id=335 bgcolor=#fefefe
| 94335 ||  || — || July 31, 2001 || Palomar || NEAT || H || align=right | 1.4 km || 
|-id=336 bgcolor=#fefefe
| 94336 ||  || — || August 9, 2001 || Palomar || NEAT || H || align=right data-sort-value="0.84" | 840 m || 
|-id=337 bgcolor=#fefefe
| 94337 ||  || — || August 16, 2001 || Socorro || LINEAR || — || align=right | 1.4 km || 
|-id=338 bgcolor=#fefefe
| 94338 ||  || — || August 16, 2001 || Socorro || LINEAR || — || align=right | 3.1 km || 
|-id=339 bgcolor=#fefefe
| 94339 ||  || — || August 19, 2001 || Socorro || LINEAR || H || align=right | 1.1 km || 
|-id=340 bgcolor=#fefefe
| 94340 ||  || — || August 19, 2001 || Socorro || LINEAR || PHO || align=right | 1.8 km || 
|-id=341 bgcolor=#fefefe
| 94341 ||  || — || August 16, 2001 || Socorro || LINEAR || FLO || align=right | 1.5 km || 
|-id=342 bgcolor=#fefefe
| 94342 ||  || — || August 16, 2001 || Socorro || LINEAR || — || align=right | 1.9 km || 
|-id=343 bgcolor=#fefefe
| 94343 ||  || — || August 16, 2001 || Socorro || LINEAR || FLO || align=right | 2.7 km || 
|-id=344 bgcolor=#fefefe
| 94344 ||  || — || August 17, 2001 || Socorro || LINEAR || — || align=right | 2.3 km || 
|-id=345 bgcolor=#fefefe
| 94345 ||  || — || August 17, 2001 || Palomar || NEAT || H || align=right | 1.4 km || 
|-id=346 bgcolor=#fefefe
| 94346 ||  || — || August 19, 2001 || Socorro || LINEAR || PHO || align=right | 4.7 km || 
|-id=347 bgcolor=#fefefe
| 94347 ||  || — || August 19, 2001 || Socorro || LINEAR || H || align=right | 1.5 km || 
|-id=348 bgcolor=#fefefe
| 94348 ||  || — || August 22, 2001 || Socorro || LINEAR || — || align=right | 1.9 km || 
|-id=349 bgcolor=#fefefe
| 94349 ||  || — || August 18, 2001 || Socorro || LINEAR || — || align=right | 1.8 km || 
|-id=350 bgcolor=#fefefe
| 94350 ||  || — || August 22, 2001 || Socorro || LINEAR || FLO || align=right | 1.3 km || 
|-id=351 bgcolor=#fefefe
| 94351 ||  || — || August 22, 2001 || Socorro || LINEAR || H || align=right | 2.8 km || 
|-id=352 bgcolor=#fefefe
| 94352 ||  || — || August 26, 2001 || Palomar || NEAT || — || align=right | 1.7 km || 
|-id=353 bgcolor=#fefefe
| 94353 ||  || — || August 22, 2001 || Socorro || LINEAR || — || align=right | 1.7 km || 
|-id=354 bgcolor=#fefefe
| 94354 ||  || — || August 25, 2001 || Socorro || LINEAR || H || align=right | 1.1 km || 
|-id=355 bgcolor=#fefefe
| 94355 ||  || — || August 25, 2001 || Palomar || NEAT || V || align=right | 1.9 km || 
|-id=356 bgcolor=#fefefe
| 94356 Naruto ||  ||  || August 28, 2001 || Kuma Kogen || A. Nakamura || — || align=right | 2.3 km || 
|-id=357 bgcolor=#fefefe
| 94357 ||  || — || August 27, 2001 || Palomar || NEAT || — || align=right | 2.2 km || 
|-id=358 bgcolor=#fefefe
| 94358 ||  || — || August 23, 2001 || Desert Eagle || W. K. Y. Yeung || — || align=right | 1.5 km || 
|-id=359 bgcolor=#fefefe
| 94359 ||  || — || August 24, 2001 || Socorro || LINEAR || FLO || align=right | 1.3 km || 
|-id=360 bgcolor=#fefefe
| 94360 ||  || — || September 8, 2001 || Socorro || LINEAR || H || align=right | 1.4 km || 
|-id=361 bgcolor=#fefefe
| 94361 ||  || — || September 7, 2001 || Socorro || LINEAR || — || align=right | 1.2 km || 
|-id=362 bgcolor=#fefefe
| 94362 ||  || — || September 11, 2001 || Socorro || LINEAR || H || align=right | 1.4 km || 
|-id=363 bgcolor=#fefefe
| 94363 ||  || — || September 12, 2001 || Socorro || LINEAR || H || align=right data-sort-value="0.98" | 980 m || 
|-id=364 bgcolor=#fefefe
| 94364 ||  || — || September 10, 2001 || Socorro || LINEAR || — || align=right | 1.6 km || 
|-id=365 bgcolor=#fefefe
| 94365 ||  || — || September 10, 2001 || Socorro || LINEAR || — || align=right | 1.5 km || 
|-id=366 bgcolor=#fefefe
| 94366 ||  || — || September 10, 2001 || Socorro || LINEAR || — || align=right | 1.6 km || 
|-id=367 bgcolor=#fefefe
| 94367 ||  || — || September 10, 2001 || Socorro || LINEAR || — || align=right | 1.6 km || 
|-id=368 bgcolor=#fefefe
| 94368 ||  || — || September 10, 2001 || Socorro || LINEAR || FLO || align=right | 1.1 km || 
|-id=369 bgcolor=#fefefe
| 94369 ||  || — || September 12, 2001 || Socorro || LINEAR || FLO || align=right | 1.1 km || 
|-id=370 bgcolor=#fefefe
| 94370 ||  || — || September 10, 2001 || Anderson Mesa || LONEOS || H || align=right | 1.1 km || 
|-id=371 bgcolor=#fefefe
| 94371 ||  || — || September 18, 2001 || Desert Eagle || W. K. Y. Yeung || — || align=right | 1.7 km || 
|-id=372 bgcolor=#fefefe
| 94372 ||  || — || September 16, 2001 || Socorro || LINEAR || — || align=right | 1.1 km || 
|-id=373 bgcolor=#fefefe
| 94373 ||  || — || September 16, 2001 || Socorro || LINEAR || — || align=right | 2.1 km || 
|-id=374 bgcolor=#fefefe
| 94374 ||  || — || September 16, 2001 || Socorro || LINEAR || V || align=right | 1.1 km || 
|-id=375 bgcolor=#fefefe
| 94375 ||  || — || September 16, 2001 || Socorro || LINEAR || — || align=right | 1.2 km || 
|-id=376 bgcolor=#fefefe
| 94376 ||  || — || September 16, 2001 || Socorro || LINEAR || FLO || align=right | 2.5 km || 
|-id=377 bgcolor=#fefefe
| 94377 ||  || — || September 17, 2001 || Socorro || LINEAR || — || align=right | 1.4 km || 
|-id=378 bgcolor=#fefefe
| 94378 ||  || — || September 17, 2001 || Socorro || LINEAR || ERI || align=right | 4.2 km || 
|-id=379 bgcolor=#fefefe
| 94379 ||  || — || September 17, 2001 || Socorro || LINEAR || — || align=right | 1.8 km || 
|-id=380 bgcolor=#fefefe
| 94380 ||  || — || September 17, 2001 || Socorro || LINEAR || FLO || align=right data-sort-value="0.97" | 970 m || 
|-id=381 bgcolor=#fefefe
| 94381 ||  || — || September 17, 2001 || Socorro || LINEAR || — || align=right | 1.8 km || 
|-id=382 bgcolor=#fefefe
| 94382 ||  || — || September 17, 2001 || Socorro || LINEAR || FLO || align=right | 1.5 km || 
|-id=383 bgcolor=#fefefe
| 94383 ||  || — || September 17, 2001 || Socorro || LINEAR || FLO || align=right | 1.3 km || 
|-id=384 bgcolor=#fefefe
| 94384 ||  || — || September 20, 2001 || Socorro || LINEAR || — || align=right | 2.7 km || 
|-id=385 bgcolor=#fefefe
| 94385 ||  || — || September 20, 2001 || Socorro || LINEAR || FLO || align=right | 3.0 km || 
|-id=386 bgcolor=#fefefe
| 94386 ||  || — || September 20, 2001 || Socorro || LINEAR || — || align=right | 2.4 km || 
|-id=387 bgcolor=#fefefe
| 94387 ||  || — || September 20, 2001 || Socorro || LINEAR || FLO || align=right | 1.8 km || 
|-id=388 bgcolor=#fefefe
| 94388 ||  || — || September 20, 2001 || Socorro || LINEAR || — || align=right | 2.1 km || 
|-id=389 bgcolor=#fefefe
| 94389 ||  || — || September 20, 2001 || Socorro || LINEAR || V || align=right | 1.9 km || 
|-id=390 bgcolor=#fefefe
| 94390 ||  || — || September 18, 2001 || Desert Eagle || W. K. Y. Yeung || FLO || align=right | 2.6 km || 
|-id=391 bgcolor=#fefefe
| 94391 ||  || — || September 18, 2001 || Desert Eagle || W. K. Y. Yeung || — || align=right | 1.4 km || 
|-id=392 bgcolor=#fefefe
| 94392 ||  || — || September 16, 2001 || Socorro || LINEAR || — || align=right | 1.3 km || 
|-id=393 bgcolor=#fefefe
| 94393 ||  || — || September 17, 2001 || Socorro || LINEAR || — || align=right | 2.0 km || 
|-id=394 bgcolor=#fefefe
| 94394 ||  || — || September 19, 2001 || Socorro || LINEAR || — || align=right | 1.2 km || 
|-id=395 bgcolor=#fefefe
| 94395 ||  || — || September 19, 2001 || Socorro || LINEAR || — || align=right | 1.3 km || 
|-id=396 bgcolor=#FA8072
| 94396 ||  || — || September 19, 2001 || Socorro || LINEAR || — || align=right | 1.5 km || 
|-id=397 bgcolor=#fefefe
| 94397 ||  || — || September 19, 2001 || Socorro || LINEAR || — || align=right | 1.4 km || 
|-id=398 bgcolor=#fefefe
| 94398 ||  || — || September 19, 2001 || Socorro || LINEAR || — || align=right | 1.9 km || 
|-id=399 bgcolor=#fefefe
| 94399 ||  || — || September 20, 2001 || Socorro || LINEAR || — || align=right | 1.3 km || 
|-id=400 bgcolor=#fefefe
| 94400 Hongdaeyong ||  ||  || September 25, 2001 || Bohyunsan || Y.-B. Jeon, Y.-H. Park, K.-J. Choo || — || align=right | 1.1 km || 
|}

94401–94500 

|-bgcolor=#fefefe
| 94401 ||  || — || September 16, 2001 || Palomar || NEAT || — || align=right | 2.6 km || 
|-id=402 bgcolor=#fefefe
| 94402 ||  || — || September 21, 2001 || Anderson Mesa || LONEOS || — || align=right | 4.6 km || 
|-id=403 bgcolor=#fefefe
| 94403 ||  || — || September 21, 2001 || Palomar || NEAT || V || align=right | 1.1 km || 
|-id=404 bgcolor=#fefefe
| 94404 ||  || — || September 30, 2001 || Emerald Lane || L. Ball || FLO || align=right | 1.0 km || 
|-id=405 bgcolor=#fefefe
| 94405 ||  || — || September 20, 2001 || Socorro || LINEAR || — || align=right data-sort-value="0.92" | 920 m || 
|-id=406 bgcolor=#fefefe
| 94406 ||  || — || September 25, 2001 || Socorro || LINEAR || — || align=right | 1.7 km || 
|-id=407 bgcolor=#fefefe
| 94407 ||  || — || October 10, 2001 || Palomar || NEAT || FLO || align=right | 1.3 km || 
|-id=408 bgcolor=#fefefe
| 94408 ||  || — || October 9, 2001 || Socorro || LINEAR || PHO || align=right | 3.1 km || 
|-id=409 bgcolor=#fefefe
| 94409 ||  || — || October 13, 2001 || Socorro || LINEAR || — || align=right | 1.4 km || 
|-id=410 bgcolor=#fefefe
| 94410 ||  || — || October 13, 2001 || Socorro || LINEAR || MAS || align=right | 2.0 km || 
|-id=411 bgcolor=#fefefe
| 94411 ||  || — || October 13, 2001 || Ametlla de Mar || J. Nomen || — || align=right | 1.2 km || 
|-id=412 bgcolor=#fefefe
| 94412 ||  || — || October 14, 2001 || Desert Eagle || W. K. Y. Yeung || NYS || align=right | 1.9 km || 
|-id=413 bgcolor=#fefefe
| 94413 ||  || — || October 9, 2001 || Socorro || LINEAR || V || align=right | 1.6 km || 
|-id=414 bgcolor=#fefefe
| 94414 ||  || — || October 14, 2001 || Socorro || LINEAR || NYS || align=right | 1.8 km || 
|-id=415 bgcolor=#fefefe
| 94415 ||  || — || October 14, 2001 || Socorro || LINEAR || — || align=right | 1.7 km || 
|-id=416 bgcolor=#E9E9E9
| 94416 ||  || — || October 14, 2001 || Socorro || LINEAR || — || align=right | 2.4 km || 
|-id=417 bgcolor=#fefefe
| 94417 ||  || — || October 14, 2001 || Socorro || LINEAR || V || align=right | 1.4 km || 
|-id=418 bgcolor=#fefefe
| 94418 ||  || — || October 14, 2001 || Socorro || LINEAR || V || align=right | 1.5 km || 
|-id=419 bgcolor=#fefefe
| 94419 ||  || — || October 14, 2001 || Socorro || LINEAR || — || align=right | 1.8 km || 
|-id=420 bgcolor=#fefefe
| 94420 ||  || — || October 14, 2001 || Socorro || LINEAR || FLO || align=right | 1.5 km || 
|-id=421 bgcolor=#fefefe
| 94421 ||  || — || October 14, 2001 || Socorro || LINEAR || V || align=right | 1.4 km || 
|-id=422 bgcolor=#fefefe
| 94422 ||  || — || October 14, 2001 || Socorro || LINEAR || FLO || align=right | 1.7 km || 
|-id=423 bgcolor=#fefefe
| 94423 ||  || — || October 14, 2001 || Socorro || LINEAR || — || align=right | 1.8 km || 
|-id=424 bgcolor=#fefefe
| 94424 ||  || — || October 14, 2001 || Socorro || LINEAR || FLO || align=right | 1.3 km || 
|-id=425 bgcolor=#fefefe
| 94425 ||  || — || October 14, 2001 || Socorro || LINEAR || V || align=right | 2.5 km || 
|-id=426 bgcolor=#fefefe
| 94426 ||  || — || October 14, 2001 || Socorro || LINEAR || — || align=right | 2.3 km || 
|-id=427 bgcolor=#fefefe
| 94427 ||  || — || October 14, 2001 || Socorro || LINEAR || — || align=right | 2.3 km || 
|-id=428 bgcolor=#fefefe
| 94428 ||  || — || October 14, 2001 || Socorro || LINEAR || — || align=right | 1.9 km || 
|-id=429 bgcolor=#fefefe
| 94429 ||  || — || October 14, 2001 || Socorro || LINEAR || — || align=right | 1.9 km || 
|-id=430 bgcolor=#E9E9E9
| 94430 ||  || — || October 14, 2001 || Socorro || LINEAR || EUN || align=right | 4.0 km || 
|-id=431 bgcolor=#fefefe
| 94431 ||  || — || October 14, 2001 || Socorro || LINEAR || V || align=right | 1.6 km || 
|-id=432 bgcolor=#fefefe
| 94432 ||  || — || October 14, 2001 || Socorro || LINEAR || FLO || align=right | 2.8 km || 
|-id=433 bgcolor=#fefefe
| 94433 ||  || — || October 14, 2001 || Socorro || LINEAR || — || align=right | 2.0 km || 
|-id=434 bgcolor=#fefefe
| 94434 ||  || — || October 14, 2001 || Socorro || LINEAR || — || align=right | 2.2 km || 
|-id=435 bgcolor=#E9E9E9
| 94435 ||  || — || October 14, 2001 || Socorro || LINEAR || — || align=right | 3.0 km || 
|-id=436 bgcolor=#fefefe
| 94436 ||  || — || October 15, 2001 || Socorro || LINEAR || PHO || align=right | 2.1 km || 
|-id=437 bgcolor=#fefefe
| 94437 ||  || — || October 13, 2001 || Socorro || LINEAR || — || align=right | 1.0 km || 
|-id=438 bgcolor=#fefefe
| 94438 ||  || — || October 13, 2001 || Socorro || LINEAR || FLO || align=right | 1.1 km || 
|-id=439 bgcolor=#fefefe
| 94439 ||  || — || October 13, 2001 || Socorro || LINEAR || — || align=right | 1.6 km || 
|-id=440 bgcolor=#fefefe
| 94440 ||  || — || October 13, 2001 || Socorro || LINEAR || — || align=right | 3.2 km || 
|-id=441 bgcolor=#fefefe
| 94441 ||  || — || October 13, 2001 || Socorro || LINEAR || — || align=right | 1.6 km || 
|-id=442 bgcolor=#fefefe
| 94442 ||  || — || October 13, 2001 || Socorro || LINEAR || — || align=right | 1.2 km || 
|-id=443 bgcolor=#fefefe
| 94443 ||  || — || October 13, 2001 || Socorro || LINEAR || — || align=right | 1.6 km || 
|-id=444 bgcolor=#fefefe
| 94444 ||  || — || October 13, 2001 || Socorro || LINEAR || FLO || align=right | 1.7 km || 
|-id=445 bgcolor=#fefefe
| 94445 ||  || — || October 13, 2001 || Socorro || LINEAR || FLO || align=right | 1.2 km || 
|-id=446 bgcolor=#fefefe
| 94446 ||  || — || October 14, 2001 || Socorro || LINEAR || — || align=right | 1.7 km || 
|-id=447 bgcolor=#fefefe
| 94447 ||  || — || October 14, 2001 || Socorro || LINEAR || FLO || align=right | 1.4 km || 
|-id=448 bgcolor=#fefefe
| 94448 ||  || — || October 14, 2001 || Socorro || LINEAR || — || align=right | 1.8 km || 
|-id=449 bgcolor=#fefefe
| 94449 ||  || — || October 14, 2001 || Socorro || LINEAR || FLO || align=right | 1.2 km || 
|-id=450 bgcolor=#fefefe
| 94450 ||  || — || October 13, 2001 || Socorro || LINEAR || — || align=right | 1.1 km || 
|-id=451 bgcolor=#fefefe
| 94451 ||  || — || October 13, 2001 || Socorro || LINEAR || V || align=right | 1.1 km || 
|-id=452 bgcolor=#fefefe
| 94452 ||  || — || October 13, 2001 || Socorro || LINEAR || NYS || align=right | 1.7 km || 
|-id=453 bgcolor=#fefefe
| 94453 ||  || — || October 13, 2001 || Socorro || LINEAR || — || align=right | 1.7 km || 
|-id=454 bgcolor=#fefefe
| 94454 ||  || — || October 13, 2001 || Socorro || LINEAR || — || align=right | 3.7 km || 
|-id=455 bgcolor=#fefefe
| 94455 ||  || — || October 13, 2001 || Socorro || LINEAR || FLO || align=right | 2.1 km || 
|-id=456 bgcolor=#fefefe
| 94456 ||  || — || October 13, 2001 || Socorro || LINEAR || NYS || align=right | 1.9 km || 
|-id=457 bgcolor=#fefefe
| 94457 ||  || — || October 14, 2001 || Socorro || LINEAR || — || align=right | 1.7 km || 
|-id=458 bgcolor=#fefefe
| 94458 ||  || — || October 14, 2001 || Socorro || LINEAR || — || align=right | 1.7 km || 
|-id=459 bgcolor=#fefefe
| 94459 ||  || — || October 14, 2001 || Socorro || LINEAR || FLO || align=right | 4.1 km || 
|-id=460 bgcolor=#fefefe
| 94460 ||  || — || October 14, 2001 || Socorro || LINEAR || FLO || align=right | 1.2 km || 
|-id=461 bgcolor=#fefefe
| 94461 ||  || — || October 14, 2001 || Socorro || LINEAR || — || align=right | 2.1 km || 
|-id=462 bgcolor=#fefefe
| 94462 ||  || — || October 13, 2001 || Kitt Peak || Spacewatch || — || align=right | 1.5 km || 
|-id=463 bgcolor=#fefefe
| 94463 ||  || — || October 12, 2001 || Bergisch Gladbach || W. Bickel || FLO || align=right | 3.1 km || 
|-id=464 bgcolor=#fefefe
| 94464 ||  || — || October 12, 2001 || Anderson Mesa || LONEOS || — || align=right data-sort-value="0.98" | 980 m || 
|-id=465 bgcolor=#fefefe
| 94465 ||  || — || October 10, 2001 || Palomar || NEAT || KLI || align=right | 4.4 km || 
|-id=466 bgcolor=#fefefe
| 94466 ||  || — || October 13, 2001 || Kitt Peak || Spacewatch || NYS || align=right | 3.9 km || 
|-id=467 bgcolor=#fefefe
| 94467 ||  || — || October 11, 2001 || Palomar || NEAT || — || align=right | 1.0 km || 
|-id=468 bgcolor=#fefefe
| 94468 ||  || — || October 14, 2001 || Socorro || LINEAR || — || align=right | 2.2 km || 
|-id=469 bgcolor=#fefefe
| 94469 ||  || — || October 14, 2001 || Socorro || LINEAR || V || align=right | 1.5 km || 
|-id=470 bgcolor=#fefefe
| 94470 ||  || — || October 15, 2001 || Socorro || LINEAR || — || align=right | 1.7 km || 
|-id=471 bgcolor=#fefefe
| 94471 ||  || — || October 14, 2001 || Socorro || LINEAR || — || align=right | 1.4 km || 
|-id=472 bgcolor=#fefefe
| 94472 ||  || — || October 14, 2001 || Socorro || LINEAR || FLO || align=right | 1.3 km || 
|-id=473 bgcolor=#fefefe
| 94473 ||  || — || October 14, 2001 || Socorro || LINEAR || — || align=right | 1.6 km || 
|-id=474 bgcolor=#fefefe
| 94474 ||  || — || October 14, 2001 || Socorro || LINEAR || — || align=right | 2.0 km || 
|-id=475 bgcolor=#fefefe
| 94475 ||  || — || October 14, 2001 || Socorro || LINEAR || — || align=right | 1.5 km || 
|-id=476 bgcolor=#fefefe
| 94476 ||  || — || October 14, 2001 || Socorro || LINEAR || — || align=right | 2.1 km || 
|-id=477 bgcolor=#fefefe
| 94477 ||  || — || October 14, 2001 || Socorro || LINEAR || V || align=right | 1.7 km || 
|-id=478 bgcolor=#fefefe
| 94478 ||  || — || October 15, 2001 || Socorro || LINEAR || FLO || align=right | 1.7 km || 
|-id=479 bgcolor=#fefefe
| 94479 ||  || — || October 14, 2001 || Socorro || LINEAR || — || align=right | 1.9 km || 
|-id=480 bgcolor=#fefefe
| 94480 ||  || — || October 17, 2001 || Desert Eagle || W. K. Y. Yeung || — || align=right | 4.5 km || 
|-id=481 bgcolor=#fefefe
| 94481 ||  || — || October 17, 2001 || Desert Eagle || W. K. Y. Yeung || V || align=right | 1.1 km || 
|-id=482 bgcolor=#fefefe
| 94482 ||  || — || October 18, 2001 || Desert Eagle || W. K. Y. Yeung || — || align=right | 2.3 km || 
|-id=483 bgcolor=#fefefe
| 94483 ||  || — || October 21, 2001 || Desert Eagle || W. K. Y. Yeung || — || align=right | 1.9 km || 
|-id=484 bgcolor=#fefefe
| 94484 ||  || — || October 21, 2001 || Desert Eagle || W. K. Y. Yeung || V || align=right | 1.2 km || 
|-id=485 bgcolor=#fefefe
| 94485 ||  || — || October 23, 2001 || Desert Eagle || W. K. Y. Yeung || — || align=right | 1.5 km || 
|-id=486 bgcolor=#fefefe
| 94486 ||  || — || October 23, 2001 || Desert Eagle || W. K. Y. Yeung || — || align=right | 1.7 km || 
|-id=487 bgcolor=#fefefe
| 94487 ||  || — || October 24, 2001 || Desert Eagle || W. K. Y. Yeung || — || align=right | 1.7 km || 
|-id=488 bgcolor=#fefefe
| 94488 ||  || — || October 18, 2001 || Socorro || LINEAR || — || align=right | 2.5 km || 
|-id=489 bgcolor=#fefefe
| 94489 ||  || — || October 16, 2001 || Socorro || LINEAR || — || align=right | 2.5 km || 
|-id=490 bgcolor=#fefefe
| 94490 ||  || — || October 16, 2001 || Socorro || LINEAR || V || align=right | 1.8 km || 
|-id=491 bgcolor=#fefefe
| 94491 ||  || — || October 16, 2001 || Socorro || LINEAR || — || align=right | 2.7 km || 
|-id=492 bgcolor=#fefefe
| 94492 ||  || — || October 16, 2001 || Socorro || LINEAR || V || align=right | 1.7 km || 
|-id=493 bgcolor=#fefefe
| 94493 ||  || — || October 17, 2001 || Socorro || LINEAR || — || align=right | 1.7 km || 
|-id=494 bgcolor=#fefefe
| 94494 ||  || — || October 17, 2001 || Socorro || LINEAR || — || align=right | 1.2 km || 
|-id=495 bgcolor=#fefefe
| 94495 ||  || — || October 17, 2001 || Socorro || LINEAR || — || align=right | 2.3 km || 
|-id=496 bgcolor=#fefefe
| 94496 ||  || — || October 17, 2001 || Socorro || LINEAR || V || align=right | 1.2 km || 
|-id=497 bgcolor=#fefefe
| 94497 ||  || — || October 17, 2001 || Socorro || LINEAR || — || align=right | 1.6 km || 
|-id=498 bgcolor=#fefefe
| 94498 ||  || — || October 17, 2001 || Socorro || LINEAR || — || align=right | 1.5 km || 
|-id=499 bgcolor=#fefefe
| 94499 ||  || — || October 17, 2001 || Socorro || LINEAR || — || align=right | 1.2 km || 
|-id=500 bgcolor=#fefefe
| 94500 ||  || — || October 17, 2001 || Socorro || LINEAR || V || align=right | 1.8 km || 
|}

94501–94600 

|-bgcolor=#fefefe
| 94501 ||  || — || October 17, 2001 || Socorro || LINEAR || FLO || align=right data-sort-value="0.87" | 870 m || 
|-id=502 bgcolor=#fefefe
| 94502 ||  || — || October 17, 2001 || Socorro || LINEAR || — || align=right | 1.6 km || 
|-id=503 bgcolor=#fefefe
| 94503 ||  || — || October 18, 2001 || Socorro || LINEAR || — || align=right | 1.8 km || 
|-id=504 bgcolor=#fefefe
| 94504 ||  || — || October 18, 2001 || Socorro || LINEAR || — || align=right | 1.5 km || 
|-id=505 bgcolor=#fefefe
| 94505 ||  || — || October 20, 2001 || Socorro || LINEAR || — || align=right data-sort-value="0.99" | 990 m || 
|-id=506 bgcolor=#fefefe
| 94506 ||  || — || October 17, 2001 || Socorro || LINEAR || — || align=right | 1.5 km || 
|-id=507 bgcolor=#fefefe
| 94507 ||  || — || October 17, 2001 || Socorro || LINEAR || FLO || align=right data-sort-value="0.94" | 940 m || 
|-id=508 bgcolor=#fefefe
| 94508 ||  || — || October 17, 2001 || Socorro || LINEAR || — || align=right | 1.4 km || 
|-id=509 bgcolor=#fefefe
| 94509 ||  || — || October 20, 2001 || Socorro || LINEAR || — || align=right | 2.2 km || 
|-id=510 bgcolor=#fefefe
| 94510 ||  || — || October 20, 2001 || Socorro || LINEAR || — || align=right | 3.4 km || 
|-id=511 bgcolor=#fefefe
| 94511 ||  || — || October 20, 2001 || Socorro || LINEAR || V || align=right | 1.3 km || 
|-id=512 bgcolor=#fefefe
| 94512 ||  || — || October 21, 2001 || Kitt Peak || Spacewatch || — || align=right | 2.4 km || 
|-id=513 bgcolor=#fefefe
| 94513 ||  || — || October 17, 2001 || Socorro || LINEAR || — || align=right | 1.8 km || 
|-id=514 bgcolor=#fefefe
| 94514 ||  || — || October 20, 2001 || Socorro || LINEAR || NYS || align=right | 1.5 km || 
|-id=515 bgcolor=#fefefe
| 94515 ||  || — || October 20, 2001 || Socorro || LINEAR || — || align=right | 1.6 km || 
|-id=516 bgcolor=#fefefe
| 94516 ||  || — || October 20, 2001 || Socorro || LINEAR || NYS || align=right | 1.4 km || 
|-id=517 bgcolor=#fefefe
| 94517 ||  || — || October 20, 2001 || Socorro || LINEAR || FLO || align=right | 1.6 km || 
|-id=518 bgcolor=#fefefe
| 94518 ||  || — || October 20, 2001 || Socorro || LINEAR || V || align=right | 1.2 km || 
|-id=519 bgcolor=#fefefe
| 94519 ||  || — || October 21, 2001 || Socorro || LINEAR || — || align=right | 1.5 km || 
|-id=520 bgcolor=#fefefe
| 94520 ||  || — || October 21, 2001 || Socorro || LINEAR || V || align=right | 1.2 km || 
|-id=521 bgcolor=#fefefe
| 94521 ||  || — || October 21, 2001 || Socorro || LINEAR || — || align=right | 2.0 km || 
|-id=522 bgcolor=#fefefe
| 94522 ||  || — || October 21, 2001 || Socorro || LINEAR || — || align=right | 1.2 km || 
|-id=523 bgcolor=#fefefe
| 94523 ||  || — || October 22, 2001 || Socorro || LINEAR || V || align=right | 1.6 km || 
|-id=524 bgcolor=#fefefe
| 94524 ||  || — || October 22, 2001 || Socorro || LINEAR || FLO || align=right | 1.5 km || 
|-id=525 bgcolor=#fefefe
| 94525 ||  || — || October 22, 2001 || Socorro || LINEAR || V || align=right | 1.8 km || 
|-id=526 bgcolor=#fefefe
| 94526 ||  || — || October 20, 2001 || Socorro || LINEAR || — || align=right | 1.2 km || 
|-id=527 bgcolor=#fefefe
| 94527 ||  || — || October 22, 2001 || Socorro || LINEAR || NYS || align=right | 3.6 km || 
|-id=528 bgcolor=#fefefe
| 94528 ||  || — || October 23, 2001 || Socorro || LINEAR || — || align=right | 1.4 km || 
|-id=529 bgcolor=#fefefe
| 94529 ||  || — || October 23, 2001 || Socorro || LINEAR || — || align=right | 1.4 km || 
|-id=530 bgcolor=#fefefe
| 94530 ||  || — || October 23, 2001 || Socorro || LINEAR || NYS || align=right | 1.7 km || 
|-id=531 bgcolor=#fefefe
| 94531 ||  || — || October 23, 2001 || Socorro || LINEAR || — || align=right | 1.6 km || 
|-id=532 bgcolor=#fefefe
| 94532 ||  || — || October 23, 2001 || Socorro || LINEAR || — || align=right | 1.1 km || 
|-id=533 bgcolor=#fefefe
| 94533 ||  || — || October 23, 2001 || Socorro || LINEAR || V || align=right | 1.8 km || 
|-id=534 bgcolor=#fefefe
| 94534 ||  || — || October 23, 2001 || Socorro || LINEAR || FLO || align=right | 1.2 km || 
|-id=535 bgcolor=#fefefe
| 94535 ||  || — || October 23, 2001 || Socorro || LINEAR || — || align=right data-sort-value="0.98" | 980 m || 
|-id=536 bgcolor=#fefefe
| 94536 ||  || — || October 23, 2001 || Socorro || LINEAR || V || align=right | 1.4 km || 
|-id=537 bgcolor=#fefefe
| 94537 ||  || — || October 23, 2001 || Socorro || LINEAR || — || align=right | 1.6 km || 
|-id=538 bgcolor=#fefefe
| 94538 ||  || — || October 23, 2001 || Socorro || LINEAR || — || align=right | 3.0 km || 
|-id=539 bgcolor=#fefefe
| 94539 ||  || — || October 19, 2001 || Palomar || NEAT || FLO || align=right | 1.4 km || 
|-id=540 bgcolor=#fefefe
| 94540 ||  || — || October 21, 2001 || Socorro || LINEAR || — || align=right | 1.6 km || 
|-id=541 bgcolor=#fefefe
| 94541 ||  || — || October 18, 2001 || Palomar || NEAT || — || align=right | 1.4 km || 
|-id=542 bgcolor=#fefefe
| 94542 ||  || — || October 18, 2001 || Palomar || NEAT || NYS || align=right | 1.5 km || 
|-id=543 bgcolor=#fefefe
| 94543 ||  || — || October 19, 2001 || Palomar || NEAT || — || align=right | 1.2 km || 
|-id=544 bgcolor=#fefefe
| 94544 ||  || — || October 24, 2001 || Palomar || NEAT || — || align=right | 1.5 km || 
|-id=545 bgcolor=#fefefe
| 94545 ||  || — || October 17, 2001 || Kitt Peak || Spacewatch || FLO || align=right | 1.6 km || 
|-id=546 bgcolor=#fefefe
| 94546 ||  || — || October 19, 2001 || Palomar || NEAT || — || align=right | 1.2 km || 
|-id=547 bgcolor=#fefefe
| 94547 ||  || — || October 19, 2001 || Palomar || NEAT || NYS || align=right | 3.2 km || 
|-id=548 bgcolor=#fefefe
| 94548 ||  || — || November 10, 2001 || Socorro || LINEAR || — || align=right | 1.5 km || 
|-id=549 bgcolor=#fefefe
| 94549 ||  || — || November 9, 2001 || Socorro || LINEAR || — || align=right | 1.5 km || 
|-id=550 bgcolor=#fefefe
| 94550 ||  || — || November 10, 2001 || Socorro || LINEAR || — || align=right | 2.4 km || 
|-id=551 bgcolor=#fefefe
| 94551 ||  || — || November 10, 2001 || Socorro || LINEAR || — || align=right | 1.1 km || 
|-id=552 bgcolor=#fefefe
| 94552 ||  || — || November 10, 2001 || Socorro || LINEAR || KLI || align=right | 4.9 km || 
|-id=553 bgcolor=#fefefe
| 94553 ||  || — || November 10, 2001 || Socorro || LINEAR || — || align=right | 2.0 km || 
|-id=554 bgcolor=#fefefe
| 94554 ||  || — || November 10, 2001 || Socorro || LINEAR || V || align=right | 1.8 km || 
|-id=555 bgcolor=#fefefe
| 94555 ||  || — || November 10, 2001 || Socorro || LINEAR || FLO || align=right | 1.8 km || 
|-id=556 bgcolor=#fefefe
| 94556 Janstarý ||  ||  || November 11, 2001 || Ondřejov || P. Pravec, P. Kušnirák || — || align=right | 1.7 km || 
|-id=557 bgcolor=#fefefe
| 94557 ||  || — || November 9, 2001 || Socorro || LINEAR || — || align=right | 1.6 km || 
|-id=558 bgcolor=#fefefe
| 94558 ||  || — || November 9, 2001 || Socorro || LINEAR || V || align=right | 2.1 km || 
|-id=559 bgcolor=#fefefe
| 94559 ||  || — || November 9, 2001 || Socorro || LINEAR || V || align=right | 1.5 km || 
|-id=560 bgcolor=#fefefe
| 94560 ||  || — || November 9, 2001 || Socorro || LINEAR || V || align=right | 2.2 km || 
|-id=561 bgcolor=#fefefe
| 94561 ||  || — || November 9, 2001 || Socorro || LINEAR || — || align=right | 1.5 km || 
|-id=562 bgcolor=#fefefe
| 94562 ||  || — || November 9, 2001 || Socorro || LINEAR || NYS || align=right | 1.9 km || 
|-id=563 bgcolor=#fefefe
| 94563 ||  || — || November 9, 2001 || Socorro || LINEAR || — || align=right | 4.3 km || 
|-id=564 bgcolor=#fefefe
| 94564 ||  || — || November 9, 2001 || Socorro || LINEAR || FLO || align=right | 1.1 km || 
|-id=565 bgcolor=#fefefe
| 94565 ||  || — || November 9, 2001 || Socorro || LINEAR || NYS || align=right | 4.0 km || 
|-id=566 bgcolor=#fefefe
| 94566 ||  || — || November 9, 2001 || Socorro || LINEAR || — || align=right | 2.1 km || 
|-id=567 bgcolor=#fefefe
| 94567 ||  || — || November 9, 2001 || Socorro || LINEAR || — || align=right | 1.9 km || 
|-id=568 bgcolor=#fefefe
| 94568 ||  || — || November 9, 2001 || Socorro || LINEAR || FLO || align=right | 1.2 km || 
|-id=569 bgcolor=#fefefe
| 94569 ||  || — || November 9, 2001 || Socorro || LINEAR || V || align=right | 1.5 km || 
|-id=570 bgcolor=#fefefe
| 94570 ||  || — || November 9, 2001 || Socorro || LINEAR || — || align=right | 2.5 km || 
|-id=571 bgcolor=#fefefe
| 94571 ||  || — || November 9, 2001 || Socorro || LINEAR || — || align=right | 2.2 km || 
|-id=572 bgcolor=#fefefe
| 94572 ||  || — || November 9, 2001 || Socorro || LINEAR || — || align=right | 1.4 km || 
|-id=573 bgcolor=#fefefe
| 94573 ||  || — || November 9, 2001 || Socorro || LINEAR || — || align=right | 1.7 km || 
|-id=574 bgcolor=#fefefe
| 94574 ||  || — || November 9, 2001 || Socorro || LINEAR || V || align=right | 1.6 km || 
|-id=575 bgcolor=#fefefe
| 94575 ||  || — || November 9, 2001 || Socorro || LINEAR || FLO || align=right | 1.7 km || 
|-id=576 bgcolor=#fefefe
| 94576 ||  || — || November 9, 2001 || Socorro || LINEAR || — || align=right | 1.9 km || 
|-id=577 bgcolor=#fefefe
| 94577 ||  || — || November 9, 2001 || Socorro || LINEAR || — || align=right | 4.2 km || 
|-id=578 bgcolor=#fefefe
| 94578 ||  || — || November 9, 2001 || Socorro || LINEAR || — || align=right | 2.5 km || 
|-id=579 bgcolor=#fefefe
| 94579 ||  || — || November 9, 2001 || Socorro || LINEAR || ERI || align=right | 3.3 km || 
|-id=580 bgcolor=#fefefe
| 94580 ||  || — || November 9, 2001 || Socorro || LINEAR || — || align=right | 4.3 km || 
|-id=581 bgcolor=#fefefe
| 94581 ||  || — || November 9, 2001 || Socorro || LINEAR || NYS || align=right | 1.8 km || 
|-id=582 bgcolor=#fefefe
| 94582 ||  || — || November 9, 2001 || Socorro || LINEAR || — || align=right | 1.8 km || 
|-id=583 bgcolor=#fefefe
| 94583 ||  || — || November 9, 2001 || Socorro || LINEAR || — || align=right | 4.0 km || 
|-id=584 bgcolor=#fefefe
| 94584 ||  || — || November 9, 2001 || Socorro || LINEAR || — || align=right | 2.1 km || 
|-id=585 bgcolor=#fefefe
| 94585 ||  || — || November 9, 2001 || Socorro || LINEAR || — || align=right | 1.8 km || 
|-id=586 bgcolor=#fefefe
| 94586 ||  || — || November 9, 2001 || Socorro || LINEAR || — || align=right | 1.4 km || 
|-id=587 bgcolor=#fefefe
| 94587 ||  || — || November 10, 2001 || Socorro || LINEAR || — || align=right | 1.8 km || 
|-id=588 bgcolor=#fefefe
| 94588 ||  || — || November 10, 2001 || Socorro || LINEAR || — || align=right | 1.7 km || 
|-id=589 bgcolor=#fefefe
| 94589 ||  || — || November 10, 2001 || Socorro || LINEAR || FLO || align=right | 1.7 km || 
|-id=590 bgcolor=#fefefe
| 94590 ||  || — || November 10, 2001 || Socorro || LINEAR || — || align=right | 1.6 km || 
|-id=591 bgcolor=#fefefe
| 94591 ||  || — || November 10, 2001 || Socorro || LINEAR || — || align=right | 1.8 km || 
|-id=592 bgcolor=#fefefe
| 94592 ||  || — || November 10, 2001 || Socorro || LINEAR || — || align=right | 1.3 km || 
|-id=593 bgcolor=#fefefe
| 94593 ||  || — || November 10, 2001 || Socorro || LINEAR || — || align=right | 1.9 km || 
|-id=594 bgcolor=#fefefe
| 94594 ||  || — || November 10, 2001 || Socorro || LINEAR || V || align=right | 1.9 km || 
|-id=595 bgcolor=#fefefe
| 94595 ||  || — || November 10, 2001 || Socorro || LINEAR || V || align=right | 2.2 km || 
|-id=596 bgcolor=#fefefe
| 94596 ||  || — || November 14, 2001 || Ondřejov || P. Kušnirák, P. Pravec || — || align=right | 1.2 km || 
|-id=597 bgcolor=#fefefe
| 94597 ||  || — || November 12, 2001 || Kitt Peak || Spacewatch || NYS || align=right | 1.8 km || 
|-id=598 bgcolor=#fefefe
| 94598 ||  || — || November 12, 2001 || Kitt Peak || Spacewatch || NYS || align=right | 1.2 km || 
|-id=599 bgcolor=#fefefe
| 94599 ||  || — || November 9, 2001 || Palomar || NEAT || V || align=right | 2.0 km || 
|-id=600 bgcolor=#fefefe
| 94600 ||  || — || November 9, 2001 || Palomar || NEAT || — || align=right | 2.0 km || 
|}

94601–94700 

|-bgcolor=#fefefe
| 94601 ||  || — || November 12, 2001 || Socorro || LINEAR || — || align=right | 1.7 km || 
|-id=602 bgcolor=#fefefe
| 94602 ||  || — || November 10, 2001 || Socorro || LINEAR || — || align=right | 1.6 km || 
|-id=603 bgcolor=#fefefe
| 94603 ||  || — || November 11, 2001 || Socorro || LINEAR || — || align=right | 1.2 km || 
|-id=604 bgcolor=#fefefe
| 94604 ||  || — || November 12, 2001 || Anderson Mesa || LONEOS || — || align=right | 1.4 km || 
|-id=605 bgcolor=#fefefe
| 94605 ||  || — || November 12, 2001 || Socorro || LINEAR || FLO || align=right | 1.5 km || 
|-id=606 bgcolor=#fefefe
| 94606 ||  || — || November 12, 2001 || Socorro || LINEAR || — || align=right | 1.2 km || 
|-id=607 bgcolor=#fefefe
| 94607 ||  || — || November 12, 2001 || Socorro || LINEAR || — || align=right | 2.1 km || 
|-id=608 bgcolor=#fefefe
| 94608 ||  || — || November 12, 2001 || Socorro || LINEAR || FLO || align=right | 1.3 km || 
|-id=609 bgcolor=#fefefe
| 94609 ||  || — || November 12, 2001 || Socorro || LINEAR || FLO || align=right | 1.8 km || 
|-id=610 bgcolor=#fefefe
| 94610 ||  || — || November 12, 2001 || Socorro || LINEAR || — || align=right | 2.8 km || 
|-id=611 bgcolor=#fefefe
| 94611 ||  || — || November 12, 2001 || Socorro || LINEAR || V || align=right | 1.8 km || 
|-id=612 bgcolor=#fefefe
| 94612 ||  || — || November 12, 2001 || Socorro || LINEAR || — || align=right | 1.5 km || 
|-id=613 bgcolor=#fefefe
| 94613 ||  || — || November 12, 2001 || Socorro || LINEAR || — || align=right | 1.2 km || 
|-id=614 bgcolor=#fefefe
| 94614 ||  || — || November 12, 2001 || Socorro || LINEAR || NYS || align=right | 1.5 km || 
|-id=615 bgcolor=#fefefe
| 94615 ||  || — || November 12, 2001 || Socorro || LINEAR || FLO || align=right | 2.1 km || 
|-id=616 bgcolor=#fefefe
| 94616 ||  || — || November 12, 2001 || Socorro || LINEAR || — || align=right | 2.2 km || 
|-id=617 bgcolor=#fefefe
| 94617 ||  || — || November 12, 2001 || Socorro || LINEAR || — || align=right | 1.4 km || 
|-id=618 bgcolor=#fefefe
| 94618 ||  || — || November 12, 2001 || Socorro || LINEAR || — || align=right | 1.2 km || 
|-id=619 bgcolor=#fefefe
| 94619 ||  || — || November 12, 2001 || Socorro || LINEAR || NYS || align=right | 3.7 km || 
|-id=620 bgcolor=#E9E9E9
| 94620 ||  || — || November 13, 2001 || Haleakala || NEAT || EUN || align=right | 3.4 km || 
|-id=621 bgcolor=#E9E9E9
| 94621 ||  || — || November 9, 2001 || Socorro || LINEAR || — || align=right | 2.0 km || 
|-id=622 bgcolor=#fefefe
| 94622 ||  || — || November 17, 2001 || Oizumi || T. Kobayashi || NYS || align=right | 1.8 km || 
|-id=623 bgcolor=#FA8072
| 94623 ||  || — || November 19, 2001 || Socorro || LINEAR || — || align=right | 2.8 km || 
|-id=624 bgcolor=#fefefe
| 94624 ||  || — || November 16, 2001 || Kitt Peak || Spacewatch || NYS || align=right | 1.3 km || 
|-id=625 bgcolor=#fefefe
| 94625 ||  || — || November 20, 2001 || Socorro || LINEAR || — || align=right | 1.4 km || 
|-id=626 bgcolor=#fefefe
| 94626 ||  || — || November 17, 2001 || Socorro || LINEAR || FLO || align=right | 1.4 km || 
|-id=627 bgcolor=#fefefe
| 94627 ||  || — || November 17, 2001 || Socorro || LINEAR || — || align=right | 1.9 km || 
|-id=628 bgcolor=#fefefe
| 94628 ||  || — || November 17, 2001 || Socorro || LINEAR || — || align=right | 1.3 km || 
|-id=629 bgcolor=#fefefe
| 94629 ||  || — || November 17, 2001 || Socorro || LINEAR || NYS || align=right | 1.2 km || 
|-id=630 bgcolor=#fefefe
| 94630 ||  || — || November 17, 2001 || Socorro || LINEAR || V || align=right | 1.2 km || 
|-id=631 bgcolor=#fefefe
| 94631 ||  || — || November 17, 2001 || Socorro || LINEAR || — || align=right | 1.9 km || 
|-id=632 bgcolor=#fefefe
| 94632 ||  || — || November 17, 2001 || Socorro || LINEAR || — || align=right | 1.4 km || 
|-id=633 bgcolor=#fefefe
| 94633 ||  || — || November 17, 2001 || Socorro || LINEAR || — || align=right | 1.7 km || 
|-id=634 bgcolor=#fefefe
| 94634 ||  || — || November 21, 2001 || San Marcello || L. Tesi, M. Tombelli || V || align=right | 1.5 km || 
|-id=635 bgcolor=#fefefe
| 94635 ||  || — || November 17, 2001 || Socorro || LINEAR || NYS || align=right | 1.6 km || 
|-id=636 bgcolor=#fefefe
| 94636 ||  || — || November 17, 2001 || Socorro || LINEAR || — || align=right | 1.7 km || 
|-id=637 bgcolor=#fefefe
| 94637 ||  || — || November 17, 2001 || Kitt Peak || Spacewatch || NYS || align=right | 4.1 km || 
|-id=638 bgcolor=#fefefe
| 94638 ||  || — || November 17, 2001 || Socorro || LINEAR || — || align=right | 1.4 km || 
|-id=639 bgcolor=#fefefe
| 94639 ||  || — || November 17, 2001 || Socorro || LINEAR || FLO || align=right | 1.5 km || 
|-id=640 bgcolor=#fefefe
| 94640 ||  || — || November 17, 2001 || Socorro || LINEAR || FLO || align=right data-sort-value="0.93" | 930 m || 
|-id=641 bgcolor=#fefefe
| 94641 ||  || — || November 17, 2001 || Socorro || LINEAR || — || align=right | 1.7 km || 
|-id=642 bgcolor=#fefefe
| 94642 ||  || — || November 17, 2001 || Socorro || LINEAR || FLO || align=right | 1.4 km || 
|-id=643 bgcolor=#fefefe
| 94643 ||  || — || November 17, 2001 || Socorro || LINEAR || — || align=right | 1.7 km || 
|-id=644 bgcolor=#fefefe
| 94644 ||  || — || November 17, 2001 || Socorro || LINEAR || — || align=right | 1.9 km || 
|-id=645 bgcolor=#fefefe
| 94645 ||  || — || November 17, 2001 || Socorro || LINEAR || — || align=right | 3.5 km || 
|-id=646 bgcolor=#fefefe
| 94646 ||  || — || November 17, 2001 || Socorro || LINEAR || — || align=right | 2.9 km || 
|-id=647 bgcolor=#fefefe
| 94647 ||  || — || November 18, 2001 || Socorro || LINEAR || — || align=right | 2.0 km || 
|-id=648 bgcolor=#fefefe
| 94648 ||  || — || November 20, 2001 || Socorro || LINEAR || — || align=right | 2.3 km || 
|-id=649 bgcolor=#fefefe
| 94649 ||  || — || November 16, 2001 || Palomar || NEAT || — || align=right | 2.2 km || 
|-id=650 bgcolor=#fefefe
| 94650 ||  || — || November 17, 2001 || Haleakala || NEAT || V || align=right | 2.7 km || 
|-id=651 bgcolor=#fefefe
| 94651 ||  || — || November 19, 2001 || Socorro || LINEAR || — || align=right | 1.5 km || 
|-id=652 bgcolor=#fefefe
| 94652 ||  || — || November 19, 2001 || Socorro || LINEAR || — || align=right | 1.5 km || 
|-id=653 bgcolor=#fefefe
| 94653 ||  || — || November 20, 2001 || Socorro || LINEAR || MAS || align=right | 1.4 km || 
|-id=654 bgcolor=#fefefe
| 94654 ||  || — || November 20, 2001 || Socorro || LINEAR || MAS || align=right | 1.5 km || 
|-id=655 bgcolor=#fefefe
| 94655 ||  || — || November 20, 2001 || Socorro || LINEAR || — || align=right | 1.7 km || 
|-id=656 bgcolor=#fefefe
| 94656 ||  || — || November 20, 2001 || Socorro || LINEAR || NYS || align=right | 1.3 km || 
|-id=657 bgcolor=#fefefe
| 94657 ||  || — || November 21, 2001 || Socorro || LINEAR || — || align=right | 1.8 km || 
|-id=658 bgcolor=#fefefe
| 94658 ||  || — || November 21, 2001 || Socorro || LINEAR || V || align=right | 1.5 km || 
|-id=659 bgcolor=#fefefe
| 94659 ||  || — || November 21, 2001 || Socorro || LINEAR || — || align=right | 2.1 km || 
|-id=660 bgcolor=#fefefe
| 94660 ||  || — || November 21, 2001 || Socorro || LINEAR || — || align=right | 1.3 km || 
|-id=661 bgcolor=#fefefe
| 94661 ||  || — || November 19, 2001 || Socorro || LINEAR || NYS || align=right | 1.3 km || 
|-id=662 bgcolor=#fefefe
| 94662 ||  || — || November 24, 2001 || Socorro || LINEAR || FLO || align=right | 1.4 km || 
|-id=663 bgcolor=#fefefe
| 94663 ||  || — || November 17, 2001 || Socorro || LINEAR || V || align=right | 1.1 km || 
|-id=664 bgcolor=#fefefe
| 94664 ||  || — || December 9, 2001 || Socorro || LINEAR || — || align=right | 1.5 km || 
|-id=665 bgcolor=#fefefe
| 94665 ||  || — || December 6, 2001 || Socorro || LINEAR || — || align=right | 1.5 km || 
|-id=666 bgcolor=#fefefe
| 94666 ||  || — || December 9, 2001 || Socorro || LINEAR || V || align=right | 1.3 km || 
|-id=667 bgcolor=#fefefe
| 94667 ||  || — || December 9, 2001 || Socorro || LINEAR || — || align=right | 2.0 km || 
|-id=668 bgcolor=#E9E9E9
| 94668 ||  || — || December 9, 2001 || Socorro || LINEAR || KON || align=right | 4.7 km || 
|-id=669 bgcolor=#fefefe
| 94669 ||  || — || December 10, 2001 || Socorro || LINEAR || MAS || align=right | 2.0 km || 
|-id=670 bgcolor=#fefefe
| 94670 ||  || — || December 9, 2001 || Socorro || LINEAR || FLO || align=right | 2.7 km || 
|-id=671 bgcolor=#fefefe
| 94671 ||  || — || December 9, 2001 || Socorro || LINEAR || FLO || align=right | 1.3 km || 
|-id=672 bgcolor=#fefefe
| 94672 ||  || — || December 9, 2001 || Socorro || LINEAR || — || align=right | 1.9 km || 
|-id=673 bgcolor=#fefefe
| 94673 ||  || — || December 9, 2001 || Socorro || LINEAR || — || align=right | 3.4 km || 
|-id=674 bgcolor=#fefefe
| 94674 ||  || — || December 9, 2001 || Socorro || LINEAR || — || align=right | 2.6 km || 
|-id=675 bgcolor=#fefefe
| 94675 ||  || — || December 9, 2001 || Socorro || LINEAR || — || align=right | 2.0 km || 
|-id=676 bgcolor=#fefefe
| 94676 ||  || — || December 9, 2001 || Socorro || LINEAR || V || align=right | 1.4 km || 
|-id=677 bgcolor=#fefefe
| 94677 ||  || — || December 9, 2001 || Socorro || LINEAR || NYS || align=right | 1.1 km || 
|-id=678 bgcolor=#fefefe
| 94678 ||  || — || December 9, 2001 || Socorro || LINEAR || — || align=right | 1.5 km || 
|-id=679 bgcolor=#fefefe
| 94679 ||  || — || December 9, 2001 || Socorro || LINEAR || — || align=right | 2.4 km || 
|-id=680 bgcolor=#fefefe
| 94680 ||  || — || December 9, 2001 || Socorro || LINEAR || — || align=right | 2.3 km || 
|-id=681 bgcolor=#fefefe
| 94681 ||  || — || December 10, 2001 || Socorro || LINEAR || — || align=right | 4.1 km || 
|-id=682 bgcolor=#fefefe
| 94682 ||  || — || December 10, 2001 || Socorro || LINEAR || — || align=right | 2.1 km || 
|-id=683 bgcolor=#fefefe
| 94683 ||  || — || December 10, 2001 || Socorro || LINEAR || — || align=right | 4.7 km || 
|-id=684 bgcolor=#fefefe
| 94684 ||  || — || December 10, 2001 || Socorro || LINEAR || — || align=right | 1.6 km || 
|-id=685 bgcolor=#fefefe
| 94685 ||  || — || December 10, 2001 || Socorro || LINEAR || FLO || align=right | 2.0 km || 
|-id=686 bgcolor=#fefefe
| 94686 ||  || — || December 10, 2001 || Socorro || LINEAR || — || align=right | 2.9 km || 
|-id=687 bgcolor=#E9E9E9
| 94687 ||  || — || December 10, 2001 || Socorro || LINEAR || EUN || align=right | 4.1 km || 
|-id=688 bgcolor=#fefefe
| 94688 ||  || — || December 10, 2001 || Socorro || LINEAR || — || align=right | 2.9 km || 
|-id=689 bgcolor=#fefefe
| 94689 ||  || — || December 10, 2001 || Socorro || LINEAR || — || align=right | 1.6 km || 
|-id=690 bgcolor=#fefefe
| 94690 ||  || — || December 10, 2001 || Socorro || LINEAR || — || align=right | 3.0 km || 
|-id=691 bgcolor=#fefefe
| 94691 ||  || — || December 11, 2001 || Socorro || LINEAR || — || align=right | 1.9 km || 
|-id=692 bgcolor=#fefefe
| 94692 ||  || — || December 11, 2001 || Socorro || LINEAR || — || align=right | 2.5 km || 
|-id=693 bgcolor=#fefefe
| 94693 ||  || — || December 10, 2001 || Socorro || LINEAR || — || align=right | 4.0 km || 
|-id=694 bgcolor=#fefefe
| 94694 ||  || — || December 9, 2001 || Socorro || LINEAR || V || align=right | 1.2 km || 
|-id=695 bgcolor=#E9E9E9
| 94695 ||  || — || December 9, 2001 || Socorro || LINEAR || HNS || align=right | 3.6 km || 
|-id=696 bgcolor=#fefefe
| 94696 ||  || — || December 9, 2001 || Socorro || LINEAR || V || align=right | 1.1 km || 
|-id=697 bgcolor=#fefefe
| 94697 ||  || — || December 9, 2001 || Socorro || LINEAR || — || align=right | 1.8 km || 
|-id=698 bgcolor=#fefefe
| 94698 ||  || — || December 9, 2001 || Socorro || LINEAR || — || align=right | 1.8 km || 
|-id=699 bgcolor=#fefefe
| 94699 ||  || — || December 9, 2001 || Socorro || LINEAR || — || align=right | 2.4 km || 
|-id=700 bgcolor=#fefefe
| 94700 ||  || — || December 11, 2001 || Socorro || LINEAR || — || align=right | 1.6 km || 
|}

94701–94800 

|-bgcolor=#fefefe
| 94701 ||  || — || December 10, 2001 || Socorro || LINEAR || — || align=right | 2.0 km || 
|-id=702 bgcolor=#fefefe
| 94702 ||  || — || December 10, 2001 || Socorro || LINEAR || — || align=right | 1.5 km || 
|-id=703 bgcolor=#fefefe
| 94703 ||  || — || December 10, 2001 || Socorro || LINEAR || NYS || align=right | 1.5 km || 
|-id=704 bgcolor=#fefefe
| 94704 ||  || — || December 10, 2001 || Socorro || LINEAR || — || align=right | 1.6 km || 
|-id=705 bgcolor=#fefefe
| 94705 ||  || — || December 10, 2001 || Socorro || LINEAR || — || align=right | 1.4 km || 
|-id=706 bgcolor=#fefefe
| 94706 ||  || — || December 10, 2001 || Socorro || LINEAR || — || align=right | 2.1 km || 
|-id=707 bgcolor=#fefefe
| 94707 ||  || — || December 10, 2001 || Socorro || LINEAR || MAS || align=right | 1.5 km || 
|-id=708 bgcolor=#E9E9E9
| 94708 ||  || — || December 10, 2001 || Socorro || LINEAR || EUN || align=right | 2.8 km || 
|-id=709 bgcolor=#fefefe
| 94709 ||  || — || December 10, 2001 || Socorro || LINEAR || NYS || align=right | 1.2 km || 
|-id=710 bgcolor=#fefefe
| 94710 ||  || — || December 10, 2001 || Socorro || LINEAR || FLO || align=right | 1.2 km || 
|-id=711 bgcolor=#fefefe
| 94711 ||  || — || December 10, 2001 || Socorro || LINEAR || — || align=right | 2.2 km || 
|-id=712 bgcolor=#fefefe
| 94712 ||  || — || December 10, 2001 || Socorro || LINEAR || — || align=right | 2.4 km || 
|-id=713 bgcolor=#fefefe
| 94713 ||  || — || December 10, 2001 || Socorro || LINEAR || NYS || align=right | 1.1 km || 
|-id=714 bgcolor=#fefefe
| 94714 ||  || — || December 10, 2001 || Socorro || LINEAR || — || align=right | 2.2 km || 
|-id=715 bgcolor=#fefefe
| 94715 ||  || — || December 10, 2001 || Socorro || LINEAR || NYS || align=right | 1.7 km || 
|-id=716 bgcolor=#fefefe
| 94716 ||  || — || December 10, 2001 || Socorro || LINEAR || NYS || align=right | 3.8 km || 
|-id=717 bgcolor=#fefefe
| 94717 ||  || — || December 10, 2001 || Socorro || LINEAR || — || align=right | 2.4 km || 
|-id=718 bgcolor=#fefefe
| 94718 ||  || — || December 10, 2001 || Socorro || LINEAR || NYS || align=right | 2.2 km || 
|-id=719 bgcolor=#fefefe
| 94719 ||  || — || December 10, 2001 || Socorro || LINEAR || V || align=right | 1.2 km || 
|-id=720 bgcolor=#fefefe
| 94720 ||  || — || December 10, 2001 || Socorro || LINEAR || MAS || align=right | 1.9 km || 
|-id=721 bgcolor=#fefefe
| 94721 ||  || — || December 10, 2001 || Socorro || LINEAR || NYS || align=right | 1.6 km || 
|-id=722 bgcolor=#fefefe
| 94722 ||  || — || December 10, 2001 || Socorro || LINEAR || — || align=right | 3.0 km || 
|-id=723 bgcolor=#fefefe
| 94723 ||  || — || December 10, 2001 || Socorro || LINEAR || — || align=right | 1.9 km || 
|-id=724 bgcolor=#fefefe
| 94724 ||  || — || December 10, 2001 || Socorro || LINEAR || — || align=right | 2.2 km || 
|-id=725 bgcolor=#fefefe
| 94725 ||  || — || December 10, 2001 || Socorro || LINEAR || NYS || align=right | 5.1 km || 
|-id=726 bgcolor=#E9E9E9
| 94726 ||  || — || December 10, 2001 || Socorro || LINEAR || — || align=right | 3.5 km || 
|-id=727 bgcolor=#E9E9E9
| 94727 ||  || — || December 10, 2001 || Socorro || LINEAR || — || align=right | 2.2 km || 
|-id=728 bgcolor=#E9E9E9
| 94728 ||  || — || December 10, 2001 || Socorro || LINEAR || EUN || align=right | 2.8 km || 
|-id=729 bgcolor=#fefefe
| 94729 ||  || — || December 10, 2001 || Socorro || LINEAR || NYS || align=right | 3.0 km || 
|-id=730 bgcolor=#fefefe
| 94730 ||  || — || December 10, 2001 || Socorro || LINEAR || NYS || align=right | 1.6 km || 
|-id=731 bgcolor=#fefefe
| 94731 ||  || — || December 10, 2001 || Socorro || LINEAR || V || align=right | 1.4 km || 
|-id=732 bgcolor=#fefefe
| 94732 ||  || — || December 10, 2001 || Socorro || LINEAR || MAS || align=right | 1.7 km || 
|-id=733 bgcolor=#fefefe
| 94733 ||  || — || December 11, 2001 || Socorro || LINEAR || FLO || align=right | 1.1 km || 
|-id=734 bgcolor=#fefefe
| 94734 ||  || — || December 11, 2001 || Socorro || LINEAR || — || align=right | 2.2 km || 
|-id=735 bgcolor=#fefefe
| 94735 ||  || — || December 11, 2001 || Socorro || LINEAR || FLO || align=right | 2.4 km || 
|-id=736 bgcolor=#fefefe
| 94736 ||  || — || December 11, 2001 || Socorro || LINEAR || FLO || align=right | 1.2 km || 
|-id=737 bgcolor=#fefefe
| 94737 ||  || — || December 11, 2001 || Socorro || LINEAR || FLO || align=right | 1.9 km || 
|-id=738 bgcolor=#fefefe
| 94738 ||  || — || December 11, 2001 || Socorro || LINEAR || NYS || align=right | 1.7 km || 
|-id=739 bgcolor=#fefefe
| 94739 ||  || — || December 11, 2001 || Socorro || LINEAR || NYS || align=right | 1.1 km || 
|-id=740 bgcolor=#fefefe
| 94740 ||  || — || December 11, 2001 || Socorro || LINEAR || NYS || align=right | 1.3 km || 
|-id=741 bgcolor=#fefefe
| 94741 ||  || — || December 11, 2001 || Socorro || LINEAR || — || align=right | 1.6 km || 
|-id=742 bgcolor=#fefefe
| 94742 ||  || — || December 11, 2001 || Socorro || LINEAR || — || align=right | 2.2 km || 
|-id=743 bgcolor=#fefefe
| 94743 ||  || — || December 11, 2001 || Socorro || LINEAR || — || align=right | 1.8 km || 
|-id=744 bgcolor=#fefefe
| 94744 ||  || — || December 11, 2001 || Socorro || LINEAR || V || align=right | 1.3 km || 
|-id=745 bgcolor=#fefefe
| 94745 ||  || — || December 11, 2001 || Socorro || LINEAR || V || align=right | 1.4 km || 
|-id=746 bgcolor=#fefefe
| 94746 ||  || — || December 11, 2001 || Socorro || LINEAR || V || align=right | 1.2 km || 
|-id=747 bgcolor=#E9E9E9
| 94747 ||  || — || December 11, 2001 || Socorro || LINEAR || BRU || align=right | 5.7 km || 
|-id=748 bgcolor=#fefefe
| 94748 ||  || — || December 11, 2001 || Socorro || LINEAR || V || align=right | 1.6 km || 
|-id=749 bgcolor=#fefefe
| 94749 ||  || — || December 11, 2001 || Socorro || LINEAR || — || align=right | 1.5 km || 
|-id=750 bgcolor=#fefefe
| 94750 ||  || — || December 11, 2001 || Socorro || LINEAR || FLO || align=right | 1.5 km || 
|-id=751 bgcolor=#fefefe
| 94751 ||  || — || December 11, 2001 || Socorro || LINEAR || — || align=right | 1.7 km || 
|-id=752 bgcolor=#fefefe
| 94752 ||  || — || December 11, 2001 || Socorro || LINEAR || — || align=right | 6.3 km || 
|-id=753 bgcolor=#fefefe
| 94753 ||  || — || December 14, 2001 || Desert Eagle || W. K. Y. Yeung || — || align=right | 1.8 km || 
|-id=754 bgcolor=#fefefe
| 94754 ||  || — || December 10, 2001 || Socorro || LINEAR || — || align=right | 1.3 km || 
|-id=755 bgcolor=#fefefe
| 94755 ||  || — || December 10, 2001 || Socorro || LINEAR || — || align=right | 1.8 km || 
|-id=756 bgcolor=#fefefe
| 94756 ||  || — || December 10, 2001 || Socorro || LINEAR || FLO || align=right | 1.7 km || 
|-id=757 bgcolor=#fefefe
| 94757 ||  || — || December 10, 2001 || Socorro || LINEAR || NYS || align=right | 2.2 km || 
|-id=758 bgcolor=#fefefe
| 94758 ||  || — || December 10, 2001 || Socorro || LINEAR || NYS || align=right | 1.5 km || 
|-id=759 bgcolor=#fefefe
| 94759 ||  || — || December 10, 2001 || Socorro || LINEAR || — || align=right | 2.3 km || 
|-id=760 bgcolor=#fefefe
| 94760 ||  || — || December 10, 2001 || Socorro || LINEAR || — || align=right | 2.1 km || 
|-id=761 bgcolor=#fefefe
| 94761 ||  || — || December 10, 2001 || Socorro || LINEAR || — || align=right | 1.7 km || 
|-id=762 bgcolor=#fefefe
| 94762 ||  || — || December 10, 2001 || Socorro || LINEAR || FLO || align=right | 1.8 km || 
|-id=763 bgcolor=#E9E9E9
| 94763 ||  || — || December 10, 2001 || Socorro || LINEAR || — || align=right | 2.2 km || 
|-id=764 bgcolor=#fefefe
| 94764 ||  || — || December 10, 2001 || Socorro || LINEAR || — || align=right | 4.0 km || 
|-id=765 bgcolor=#fefefe
| 94765 ||  || — || December 10, 2001 || Socorro || LINEAR || — || align=right | 2.4 km || 
|-id=766 bgcolor=#E9E9E9
| 94766 ||  || — || December 10, 2001 || Socorro || LINEAR || — || align=right | 3.1 km || 
|-id=767 bgcolor=#fefefe
| 94767 ||  || — || December 10, 2001 || Socorro || LINEAR || — || align=right | 2.1 km || 
|-id=768 bgcolor=#fefefe
| 94768 ||  || — || December 10, 2001 || Socorro || LINEAR || NYS || align=right | 1.6 km || 
|-id=769 bgcolor=#fefefe
| 94769 ||  || — || December 10, 2001 || Socorro || LINEAR || — || align=right | 2.2 km || 
|-id=770 bgcolor=#fefefe
| 94770 ||  || — || December 10, 2001 || Socorro || LINEAR || — || align=right | 1.7 km || 
|-id=771 bgcolor=#E9E9E9
| 94771 ||  || — || December 14, 2001 || Kingsnake || J. V. McClusky || — || align=right | 2.6 km || 
|-id=772 bgcolor=#fefefe
| 94772 ||  || — || December 10, 2001 || Socorro || LINEAR || — || align=right | 4.1 km || 
|-id=773 bgcolor=#fefefe
| 94773 ||  || — || December 10, 2001 || Socorro || LINEAR || — || align=right | 4.2 km || 
|-id=774 bgcolor=#fefefe
| 94774 ||  || — || December 10, 2001 || Socorro || LINEAR || FLO || align=right | 2.0 km || 
|-id=775 bgcolor=#fefefe
| 94775 ||  || — || December 11, 2001 || Socorro || LINEAR || FLO || align=right | 1.4 km || 
|-id=776 bgcolor=#fefefe
| 94776 ||  || — || December 11, 2001 || Socorro || LINEAR || V || align=right | 1.5 km || 
|-id=777 bgcolor=#fefefe
| 94777 ||  || — || December 13, 2001 || Socorro || LINEAR || V || align=right | 1.6 km || 
|-id=778 bgcolor=#fefefe
| 94778 ||  || — || December 13, 2001 || Socorro || LINEAR || — || align=right | 2.2 km || 
|-id=779 bgcolor=#fefefe
| 94779 ||  || — || December 13, 2001 || Socorro || LINEAR || FLO || align=right | 1.8 km || 
|-id=780 bgcolor=#fefefe
| 94780 ||  || — || December 13, 2001 || Socorro || LINEAR || — || align=right | 1.8 km || 
|-id=781 bgcolor=#fefefe
| 94781 ||  || — || December 13, 2001 || Socorro || LINEAR || — || align=right | 1.8 km || 
|-id=782 bgcolor=#fefefe
| 94782 ||  || — || December 13, 2001 || Socorro || LINEAR || — || align=right | 2.2 km || 
|-id=783 bgcolor=#E9E9E9
| 94783 ||  || — || December 13, 2001 || Socorro || LINEAR || — || align=right | 2.7 km || 
|-id=784 bgcolor=#fefefe
| 94784 ||  || — || December 13, 2001 || Socorro || LINEAR || — || align=right | 2.4 km || 
|-id=785 bgcolor=#fefefe
| 94785 ||  || — || December 13, 2001 || Socorro || LINEAR || — || align=right | 2.5 km || 
|-id=786 bgcolor=#fefefe
| 94786 ||  || — || December 13, 2001 || Socorro || LINEAR || — || align=right | 2.6 km || 
|-id=787 bgcolor=#fefefe
| 94787 ||  || — || December 14, 2001 || Socorro || LINEAR || NYS || align=right | 3.2 km || 
|-id=788 bgcolor=#fefefe
| 94788 ||  || — || December 14, 2001 || Socorro || LINEAR || — || align=right | 1.00 km || 
|-id=789 bgcolor=#fefefe
| 94789 ||  || — || December 14, 2001 || Socorro || LINEAR || — || align=right data-sort-value="0.99" | 990 m || 
|-id=790 bgcolor=#E9E9E9
| 94790 ||  || — || December 14, 2001 || Socorro || LINEAR || KON || align=right | 3.8 km || 
|-id=791 bgcolor=#fefefe
| 94791 ||  || — || December 14, 2001 || Socorro || LINEAR || — || align=right | 1.2 km || 
|-id=792 bgcolor=#fefefe
| 94792 ||  || — || December 14, 2001 || Socorro || LINEAR || V || align=right | 1.2 km || 
|-id=793 bgcolor=#E9E9E9
| 94793 ||  || — || December 14, 2001 || Socorro || LINEAR || MIS || align=right | 4.7 km || 
|-id=794 bgcolor=#fefefe
| 94794 ||  || — || December 14, 2001 || Socorro || LINEAR || V || align=right | 1.3 km || 
|-id=795 bgcolor=#fefefe
| 94795 ||  || — || December 14, 2001 || Socorro || LINEAR || FLO || align=right | 1.5 km || 
|-id=796 bgcolor=#fefefe
| 94796 ||  || — || December 14, 2001 || Socorro || LINEAR || — || align=right | 2.4 km || 
|-id=797 bgcolor=#E9E9E9
| 94797 ||  || — || December 14, 2001 || Socorro || LINEAR || — || align=right | 1.7 km || 
|-id=798 bgcolor=#fefefe
| 94798 ||  || — || December 14, 2001 || Socorro || LINEAR || — || align=right | 1.6 km || 
|-id=799 bgcolor=#fefefe
| 94799 ||  || — || December 14, 2001 || Socorro || LINEAR || V || align=right | 1.9 km || 
|-id=800 bgcolor=#E9E9E9
| 94800 ||  || — || December 14, 2001 || Socorro || LINEAR || — || align=right | 1.8 km || 
|}

94801–94900 

|-bgcolor=#fefefe
| 94801 ||  || — || December 14, 2001 || Socorro || LINEAR || — || align=right | 1.4 km || 
|-id=802 bgcolor=#fefefe
| 94802 ||  || — || December 14, 2001 || Socorro || LINEAR || V || align=right | 1.6 km || 
|-id=803 bgcolor=#fefefe
| 94803 ||  || — || December 14, 2001 || Socorro || LINEAR || — || align=right | 2.1 km || 
|-id=804 bgcolor=#fefefe
| 94804 ||  || — || December 14, 2001 || Socorro || LINEAR || NYS || align=right | 1.9 km || 
|-id=805 bgcolor=#fefefe
| 94805 ||  || — || December 14, 2001 || Socorro || LINEAR || — || align=right | 2.4 km || 
|-id=806 bgcolor=#fefefe
| 94806 ||  || — || December 14, 2001 || Socorro || LINEAR || FLO || align=right | 1.7 km || 
|-id=807 bgcolor=#fefefe
| 94807 ||  || — || December 14, 2001 || Socorro || LINEAR || — || align=right | 1.7 km || 
|-id=808 bgcolor=#fefefe
| 94808 ||  || — || December 14, 2001 || Socorro || LINEAR || — || align=right | 1.4 km || 
|-id=809 bgcolor=#fefefe
| 94809 ||  || — || December 14, 2001 || Socorro || LINEAR || — || align=right | 1.8 km || 
|-id=810 bgcolor=#fefefe
| 94810 ||  || — || December 14, 2001 || Socorro || LINEAR || — || align=right | 3.5 km || 
|-id=811 bgcolor=#fefefe
| 94811 ||  || — || December 14, 2001 || Socorro || LINEAR || — || align=right | 2.3 km || 
|-id=812 bgcolor=#fefefe
| 94812 ||  || — || December 14, 2001 || Socorro || LINEAR || V || align=right | 1.5 km || 
|-id=813 bgcolor=#fefefe
| 94813 ||  || — || December 14, 2001 || Socorro || LINEAR || — || align=right | 2.0 km || 
|-id=814 bgcolor=#fefefe
| 94814 ||  || — || December 14, 2001 || Socorro || LINEAR || MAS || align=right | 1.2 km || 
|-id=815 bgcolor=#fefefe
| 94815 ||  || — || December 14, 2001 || Socorro || LINEAR || — || align=right | 1.0 km || 
|-id=816 bgcolor=#E9E9E9
| 94816 ||  || — || December 14, 2001 || Socorro || LINEAR || — || align=right | 1.7 km || 
|-id=817 bgcolor=#fefefe
| 94817 ||  || — || December 14, 2001 || Socorro || LINEAR || NYS || align=right | 1.5 km || 
|-id=818 bgcolor=#E9E9E9
| 94818 ||  || — || December 14, 2001 || Socorro || LINEAR || — || align=right | 1.9 km || 
|-id=819 bgcolor=#E9E9E9
| 94819 ||  || — || December 14, 2001 || Socorro || LINEAR || — || align=right | 3.4 km || 
|-id=820 bgcolor=#fefefe
| 94820 ||  || — || December 14, 2001 || Socorro || LINEAR || NYS || align=right | 3.9 km || 
|-id=821 bgcolor=#fefefe
| 94821 ||  || — || December 14, 2001 || Socorro || LINEAR || NYS || align=right | 1.4 km || 
|-id=822 bgcolor=#fefefe
| 94822 ||  || — || December 14, 2001 || Socorro || LINEAR || NYS || align=right | 1.1 km || 
|-id=823 bgcolor=#fefefe
| 94823 ||  || — || December 14, 2001 || Socorro || LINEAR || NYS || align=right | 1.2 km || 
|-id=824 bgcolor=#fefefe
| 94824 ||  || — || December 14, 2001 || Socorro || LINEAR || FLO || align=right | 1.4 km || 
|-id=825 bgcolor=#E9E9E9
| 94825 ||  || — || December 14, 2001 || Socorro || LINEAR || — || align=right | 1.9 km || 
|-id=826 bgcolor=#fefefe
| 94826 ||  || — || December 14, 2001 || Socorro || LINEAR || — || align=right | 1.5 km || 
|-id=827 bgcolor=#fefefe
| 94827 ||  || — || December 14, 2001 || Socorro || LINEAR || — || align=right | 1.3 km || 
|-id=828 bgcolor=#fefefe
| 94828 ||  || — || December 14, 2001 || Socorro || LINEAR || — || align=right | 1.4 km || 
|-id=829 bgcolor=#fefefe
| 94829 ||  || — || December 14, 2001 || Socorro || LINEAR || — || align=right | 1.5 km || 
|-id=830 bgcolor=#fefefe
| 94830 ||  || — || December 14, 2001 || Socorro || LINEAR || NYS || align=right | 1.0 km || 
|-id=831 bgcolor=#fefefe
| 94831 ||  || — || December 14, 2001 || Socorro || LINEAR || MAS || align=right | 1.8 km || 
|-id=832 bgcolor=#E9E9E9
| 94832 ||  || — || December 14, 2001 || Socorro || LINEAR || — || align=right | 1.9 km || 
|-id=833 bgcolor=#fefefe
| 94833 ||  || — || December 14, 2001 || Socorro || LINEAR || EUT || align=right | 2.0 km || 
|-id=834 bgcolor=#fefefe
| 94834 ||  || — || December 14, 2001 || Socorro || LINEAR || — || align=right | 1.8 km || 
|-id=835 bgcolor=#fefefe
| 94835 ||  || — || December 14, 2001 || Socorro || LINEAR || FLO || align=right | 1.0 km || 
|-id=836 bgcolor=#fefefe
| 94836 ||  || — || December 14, 2001 || Socorro || LINEAR || NYS || align=right | 1.1 km || 
|-id=837 bgcolor=#fefefe
| 94837 ||  || — || December 14, 2001 || Socorro || LINEAR || — || align=right | 2.1 km || 
|-id=838 bgcolor=#E9E9E9
| 94838 ||  || — || December 14, 2001 || Socorro || LINEAR || — || align=right | 3.3 km || 
|-id=839 bgcolor=#fefefe
| 94839 ||  || — || December 14, 2001 || Socorro || LINEAR || V || align=right | 1.5 km || 
|-id=840 bgcolor=#fefefe
| 94840 ||  || — || December 14, 2001 || Socorro || LINEAR || — || align=right | 2.0 km || 
|-id=841 bgcolor=#fefefe
| 94841 ||  || — || December 14, 2001 || Socorro || LINEAR || NYS || align=right | 1.2 km || 
|-id=842 bgcolor=#fefefe
| 94842 ||  || — || December 11, 2001 || Socorro || LINEAR || FLO || align=right | 1.8 km || 
|-id=843 bgcolor=#fefefe
| 94843 ||  || — || December 11, 2001 || Socorro || LINEAR || — || align=right | 2.0 km || 
|-id=844 bgcolor=#fefefe
| 94844 ||  || — || December 11, 2001 || Socorro || LINEAR || FLO || align=right | 1.3 km || 
|-id=845 bgcolor=#fefefe
| 94845 ||  || — || December 11, 2001 || Socorro || LINEAR || NYS || align=right | 3.9 km || 
|-id=846 bgcolor=#fefefe
| 94846 ||  || — || December 11, 2001 || Socorro || LINEAR || V || align=right | 1.2 km || 
|-id=847 bgcolor=#fefefe
| 94847 ||  || — || December 11, 2001 || Socorro || LINEAR || — || align=right | 1.7 km || 
|-id=848 bgcolor=#fefefe
| 94848 ||  || — || December 11, 2001 || Socorro || LINEAR || — || align=right | 1.6 km || 
|-id=849 bgcolor=#fefefe
| 94849 ||  || — || December 11, 2001 || Socorro || LINEAR || FLO || align=right | 1.6 km || 
|-id=850 bgcolor=#fefefe
| 94850 ||  || — || December 11, 2001 || Socorro || LINEAR || V || align=right | 1.2 km || 
|-id=851 bgcolor=#fefefe
| 94851 ||  || — || December 11, 2001 || Socorro || LINEAR || — || align=right | 1.6 km || 
|-id=852 bgcolor=#fefefe
| 94852 ||  || — || December 11, 2001 || Socorro || LINEAR || FLO || align=right | 2.5 km || 
|-id=853 bgcolor=#fefefe
| 94853 ||  || — || December 11, 2001 || Socorro || LINEAR || V || align=right | 1.3 km || 
|-id=854 bgcolor=#fefefe
| 94854 ||  || — || December 11, 2001 || Socorro || LINEAR || FLO || align=right | 1.5 km || 
|-id=855 bgcolor=#fefefe
| 94855 ||  || — || December 11, 2001 || Socorro || LINEAR || — || align=right | 2.1 km || 
|-id=856 bgcolor=#fefefe
| 94856 ||  || — || December 11, 2001 || Socorro || LINEAR || — || align=right | 1.5 km || 
|-id=857 bgcolor=#fefefe
| 94857 ||  || — || December 11, 2001 || Socorro || LINEAR || FLO || align=right | 1.2 km || 
|-id=858 bgcolor=#E9E9E9
| 94858 ||  || — || December 11, 2001 || Socorro || LINEAR || RAF || align=right | 1.8 km || 
|-id=859 bgcolor=#fefefe
| 94859 ||  || — || December 11, 2001 || Socorro || LINEAR || — || align=right | 1.9 km || 
|-id=860 bgcolor=#fefefe
| 94860 ||  || — || December 11, 2001 || Socorro || LINEAR || — || align=right | 1.0 km || 
|-id=861 bgcolor=#fefefe
| 94861 ||  || — || December 11, 2001 || Socorro || LINEAR || — || align=right | 1.7 km || 
|-id=862 bgcolor=#fefefe
| 94862 ||  || — || December 13, 2001 || Socorro || LINEAR || — || align=right | 1.7 km || 
|-id=863 bgcolor=#fefefe
| 94863 ||  || — || December 14, 2001 || Socorro || LINEAR || NYS || align=right | 1.3 km || 
|-id=864 bgcolor=#E9E9E9
| 94864 ||  || — || December 14, 2001 || Socorro || LINEAR || CLO || align=right | 5.7 km || 
|-id=865 bgcolor=#E9E9E9
| 94865 ||  || — || December 14, 2001 || Socorro || LINEAR || — || align=right | 2.4 km || 
|-id=866 bgcolor=#fefefe
| 94866 ||  || — || December 14, 2001 || Socorro || LINEAR || FLO || align=right | 1.4 km || 
|-id=867 bgcolor=#fefefe
| 94867 ||  || — || December 15, 2001 || Socorro || LINEAR || NYS || align=right | 4.2 km || 
|-id=868 bgcolor=#fefefe
| 94868 ||  || — || December 15, 2001 || Socorro || LINEAR || — || align=right | 1.5 km || 
|-id=869 bgcolor=#fefefe
| 94869 ||  || — || December 15, 2001 || Socorro || LINEAR || — || align=right | 1.6 km || 
|-id=870 bgcolor=#fefefe
| 94870 ||  || — || December 15, 2001 || Socorro || LINEAR || V || align=right | 1.2 km || 
|-id=871 bgcolor=#fefefe
| 94871 ||  || — || December 15, 2001 || Socorro || LINEAR || — || align=right | 4.2 km || 
|-id=872 bgcolor=#E9E9E9
| 94872 ||  || — || December 15, 2001 || Socorro || LINEAR || — || align=right | 3.2 km || 
|-id=873 bgcolor=#E9E9E9
| 94873 ||  || — || December 15, 2001 || Socorro || LINEAR || — || align=right | 1.6 km || 
|-id=874 bgcolor=#fefefe
| 94874 ||  || — || December 15, 2001 || Socorro || LINEAR || — || align=right | 1.8 km || 
|-id=875 bgcolor=#fefefe
| 94875 ||  || — || December 15, 2001 || Socorro || LINEAR || — || align=right | 2.5 km || 
|-id=876 bgcolor=#fefefe
| 94876 ||  || — || December 15, 2001 || Socorro || LINEAR || V || align=right | 1.4 km || 
|-id=877 bgcolor=#fefefe
| 94877 ||  || — || December 15, 2001 || Socorro || LINEAR || — || align=right | 1.7 km || 
|-id=878 bgcolor=#fefefe
| 94878 ||  || — || December 15, 2001 || Socorro || LINEAR || FLO || align=right | 1.1 km || 
|-id=879 bgcolor=#fefefe
| 94879 ||  || — || December 15, 2001 || Socorro || LINEAR || V || align=right | 1.2 km || 
|-id=880 bgcolor=#fefefe
| 94880 ||  || — || December 14, 2001 || Socorro || LINEAR || NYS || align=right | 1.3 km || 
|-id=881 bgcolor=#E9E9E9
| 94881 ||  || — || December 14, 2001 || Socorro || LINEAR || — || align=right | 6.2 km || 
|-id=882 bgcolor=#fefefe
| 94882 ||  || — || December 15, 2001 || Socorro || LINEAR || — || align=right | 4.2 km || 
|-id=883 bgcolor=#E9E9E9
| 94883 ||  || — || December 14, 2001 || Kitt Peak || Spacewatch || HEN || align=right | 1.7 km || 
|-id=884 bgcolor=#fefefe
| 94884 Takuya ||  ||  || December 14, 2001 || Uccle || H. Boffin || — || align=right | 1.5 km || 
|-id=885 bgcolor=#fefefe
| 94885 ||  || — || December 14, 2001 || Socorro || LINEAR || NYS || align=right | 2.7 km || 
|-id=886 bgcolor=#E9E9E9
| 94886 ||  || — || December 14, 2001 || Socorro || LINEAR || EUN || align=right | 2.4 km || 
|-id=887 bgcolor=#fefefe
| 94887 ||  || — || December 14, 2001 || Socorro || LINEAR || — || align=right | 3.0 km || 
|-id=888 bgcolor=#fefefe
| 94888 ||  || — || December 15, 2001 || Socorro || LINEAR || V || align=right | 1.4 km || 
|-id=889 bgcolor=#fefefe
| 94889 || 2001 YK || — || December 17, 2001 || Socorro || LINEAR || — || align=right | 1.6 km || 
|-id=890 bgcolor=#fefefe
| 94890 ||  || — || December 18, 2001 || Socorro || LINEAR || — || align=right | 1.6 km || 
|-id=891 bgcolor=#FA8072
| 94891 ||  || — || December 23, 2001 || Socorro || LINEAR || — || align=right | 3.5 km || 
|-id=892 bgcolor=#fefefe
| 94892 ||  || — || December 25, 2001 || Ametlla de Mar || Ametlla de Mar Obs. || V || align=right | 1.5 km || 
|-id=893 bgcolor=#fefefe
| 94893 ||  || — || December 25, 2001 || Ametlla de Mar || J. Nomen || — || align=right | 1.7 km || 
|-id=894 bgcolor=#fefefe
| 94894 ||  || — || December 17, 2001 || Palomar || NEAT || MAS || align=right | 1.4 km || 
|-id=895 bgcolor=#fefefe
| 94895 ||  || — || December 17, 2001 || Socorro || LINEAR || V || align=right | 1.5 km || 
|-id=896 bgcolor=#fefefe
| 94896 ||  || — || December 17, 2001 || Socorro || LINEAR || V || align=right | 1.9 km || 
|-id=897 bgcolor=#fefefe
| 94897 ||  || — || December 17, 2001 || Socorro || LINEAR || FLO || align=right | 1.6 km || 
|-id=898 bgcolor=#fefefe
| 94898 ||  || — || December 17, 2001 || Socorro || LINEAR || NYS || align=right | 1.0 km || 
|-id=899 bgcolor=#fefefe
| 94899 ||  || — || December 17, 2001 || Socorro || LINEAR || — || align=right | 1.2 km || 
|-id=900 bgcolor=#fefefe
| 94900 ||  || — || December 17, 2001 || Socorro || LINEAR || — || align=right | 1.7 km || 
|}

94901–95000 

|-bgcolor=#fefefe
| 94901 ||  || — || December 17, 2001 || Socorro || LINEAR || MAS || align=right | 1.3 km || 
|-id=902 bgcolor=#fefefe
| 94902 ||  || — || December 17, 2001 || Socorro || LINEAR || — || align=right | 1.4 km || 
|-id=903 bgcolor=#fefefe
| 94903 ||  || — || December 18, 2001 || Socorro || LINEAR || V || align=right | 1.4 km || 
|-id=904 bgcolor=#fefefe
| 94904 ||  || — || December 18, 2001 || Socorro || LINEAR || — || align=right | 2.8 km || 
|-id=905 bgcolor=#fefefe
| 94905 ||  || — || December 18, 2001 || Socorro || LINEAR || MAS || align=right | 1.5 km || 
|-id=906 bgcolor=#E9E9E9
| 94906 ||  || — || December 18, 2001 || Socorro || LINEAR || — || align=right | 6.3 km || 
|-id=907 bgcolor=#fefefe
| 94907 ||  || — || December 18, 2001 || Socorro || LINEAR || — || align=right | 3.9 km || 
|-id=908 bgcolor=#fefefe
| 94908 ||  || — || December 18, 2001 || Socorro || LINEAR || — || align=right | 1.9 km || 
|-id=909 bgcolor=#fefefe
| 94909 ||  || — || December 18, 2001 || Socorro || LINEAR || — || align=right | 1.5 km || 
|-id=910 bgcolor=#E9E9E9
| 94910 ||  || — || December 18, 2001 || Socorro || LINEAR || — || align=right | 2.1 km || 
|-id=911 bgcolor=#fefefe
| 94911 ||  || — || December 18, 2001 || Socorro || LINEAR || — || align=right | 1.2 km || 
|-id=912 bgcolor=#fefefe
| 94912 ||  || — || December 18, 2001 || Socorro || LINEAR || MAS || align=right | 1.7 km || 
|-id=913 bgcolor=#fefefe
| 94913 ||  || — || December 18, 2001 || Socorro || LINEAR || NYS || align=right | 1.2 km || 
|-id=914 bgcolor=#fefefe
| 94914 ||  || — || December 18, 2001 || Socorro || LINEAR || — || align=right | 1.6 km || 
|-id=915 bgcolor=#fefefe
| 94915 ||  || — || December 18, 2001 || Socorro || LINEAR || V || align=right | 1.2 km || 
|-id=916 bgcolor=#fefefe
| 94916 ||  || — || December 18, 2001 || Socorro || LINEAR || MAS || align=right | 1.9 km || 
|-id=917 bgcolor=#fefefe
| 94917 ||  || — || December 18, 2001 || Socorro || LINEAR || — || align=right | 1.8 km || 
|-id=918 bgcolor=#fefefe
| 94918 ||  || — || December 18, 2001 || Socorro || LINEAR || FLO || align=right | 1.0 km || 
|-id=919 bgcolor=#fefefe
| 94919 ||  || — || December 18, 2001 || Socorro || LINEAR || V || align=right | 1.5 km || 
|-id=920 bgcolor=#fefefe
| 94920 ||  || — || December 18, 2001 || Socorro || LINEAR || — || align=right | 1.9 km || 
|-id=921 bgcolor=#E9E9E9
| 94921 ||  || — || December 18, 2001 || Socorro || LINEAR || MRX || align=right | 2.5 km || 
|-id=922 bgcolor=#E9E9E9
| 94922 ||  || — || December 18, 2001 || Socorro || LINEAR || — || align=right | 4.9 km || 
|-id=923 bgcolor=#fefefe
| 94923 ||  || — || December 18, 2001 || Socorro || LINEAR || — || align=right | 1.4 km || 
|-id=924 bgcolor=#fefefe
| 94924 ||  || — || December 18, 2001 || Socorro || LINEAR || — || align=right | 4.3 km || 
|-id=925 bgcolor=#fefefe
| 94925 ||  || — || December 18, 2001 || Socorro || LINEAR || — || align=right | 2.0 km || 
|-id=926 bgcolor=#fefefe
| 94926 ||  || — || December 18, 2001 || Socorro || LINEAR || — || align=right | 1.7 km || 
|-id=927 bgcolor=#fefefe
| 94927 ||  || — || December 18, 2001 || Socorro || LINEAR || — || align=right | 2.4 km || 
|-id=928 bgcolor=#fefefe
| 94928 ||  || — || December 18, 2001 || Socorro || LINEAR || MAS || align=right | 1.5 km || 
|-id=929 bgcolor=#fefefe
| 94929 ||  || — || December 18, 2001 || Socorro || LINEAR || — || align=right | 1.7 km || 
|-id=930 bgcolor=#fefefe
| 94930 ||  || — || December 18, 2001 || Socorro || LINEAR || V || align=right | 1.6 km || 
|-id=931 bgcolor=#fefefe
| 94931 ||  || — || December 18, 2001 || Socorro || LINEAR || NYS || align=right | 1.8 km || 
|-id=932 bgcolor=#fefefe
| 94932 ||  || — || December 18, 2001 || Socorro || LINEAR || V || align=right | 1.7 km || 
|-id=933 bgcolor=#fefefe
| 94933 ||  || — || December 18, 2001 || Socorro || LINEAR || — || align=right | 4.4 km || 
|-id=934 bgcolor=#E9E9E9
| 94934 ||  || — || December 18, 2001 || Socorro || LINEAR || — || align=right | 4.5 km || 
|-id=935 bgcolor=#E9E9E9
| 94935 ||  || — || December 18, 2001 || Socorro || LINEAR || — || align=right | 4.0 km || 
|-id=936 bgcolor=#fefefe
| 94936 ||  || — || December 18, 2001 || Socorro || LINEAR || V || align=right | 1.4 km || 
|-id=937 bgcolor=#fefefe
| 94937 ||  || — || December 18, 2001 || Socorro || LINEAR || NYS || align=right | 1.1 km || 
|-id=938 bgcolor=#fefefe
| 94938 ||  || — || December 18, 2001 || Socorro || LINEAR || FLO || align=right | 2.5 km || 
|-id=939 bgcolor=#fefefe
| 94939 ||  || — || December 18, 2001 || Socorro || LINEAR || NYS || align=right | 1.5 km || 
|-id=940 bgcolor=#E9E9E9
| 94940 ||  || — || December 18, 2001 || Socorro || LINEAR || — || align=right | 1.6 km || 
|-id=941 bgcolor=#fefefe
| 94941 ||  || — || December 18, 2001 || Socorro || LINEAR || — || align=right | 1.8 km || 
|-id=942 bgcolor=#fefefe
| 94942 ||  || — || December 18, 2001 || Socorro || LINEAR || V || align=right | 1.5 km || 
|-id=943 bgcolor=#fefefe
| 94943 ||  || — || December 18, 2001 || Socorro || LINEAR || — || align=right | 2.0 km || 
|-id=944 bgcolor=#fefefe
| 94944 ||  || — || December 18, 2001 || Socorro || LINEAR || NYS || align=right | 1.1 km || 
|-id=945 bgcolor=#fefefe
| 94945 ||  || — || December 18, 2001 || Socorro || LINEAR || NYS || align=right | 1.3 km || 
|-id=946 bgcolor=#fefefe
| 94946 ||  || — || December 18, 2001 || Socorro || LINEAR || — || align=right | 1.5 km || 
|-id=947 bgcolor=#E9E9E9
| 94947 ||  || — || December 18, 2001 || Socorro || LINEAR || — || align=right | 2.5 km || 
|-id=948 bgcolor=#E9E9E9
| 94948 ||  || — || December 18, 2001 || Socorro || LINEAR || — || align=right | 1.9 km || 
|-id=949 bgcolor=#fefefe
| 94949 ||  || — || December 18, 2001 || Socorro || LINEAR || — || align=right | 1.3 km || 
|-id=950 bgcolor=#fefefe
| 94950 ||  || — || December 18, 2001 || Socorro || LINEAR || — || align=right | 1.6 km || 
|-id=951 bgcolor=#fefefe
| 94951 ||  || — || December 18, 2001 || Socorro || LINEAR || — || align=right | 2.0 km || 
|-id=952 bgcolor=#fefefe
| 94952 ||  || — || December 18, 2001 || Socorro || LINEAR || V || align=right | 1.3 km || 
|-id=953 bgcolor=#fefefe
| 94953 ||  || — || December 18, 2001 || Socorro || LINEAR || V || align=right | 1.3 km || 
|-id=954 bgcolor=#fefefe
| 94954 ||  || — || December 18, 2001 || Socorro || LINEAR || — || align=right | 2.6 km || 
|-id=955 bgcolor=#fefefe
| 94955 ||  || — || December 21, 2001 || Cima Ekar || ADAS || PHO || align=right | 2.6 km || 
|-id=956 bgcolor=#fefefe
| 94956 ||  || — || December 18, 2001 || Palomar || NEAT || NYS || align=right | 1.7 km || 
|-id=957 bgcolor=#fefefe
| 94957 ||  || — || December 18, 2001 || Palomar || NEAT || V || align=right | 1.3 km || 
|-id=958 bgcolor=#fefefe
| 94958 ||  || — || December 18, 2001 || Palomar || NEAT || — || align=right | 1.7 km || 
|-id=959 bgcolor=#fefefe
| 94959 ||  || — || December 17, 2001 || Socorro || LINEAR || MAS || align=right | 1.7 km || 
|-id=960 bgcolor=#fefefe
| 94960 ||  || — || December 17, 2001 || Socorro || LINEAR || NYS || align=right | 1.6 km || 
|-id=961 bgcolor=#E9E9E9
| 94961 ||  || — || December 17, 2001 || Socorro || LINEAR || — || align=right | 2.1 km || 
|-id=962 bgcolor=#fefefe
| 94962 ||  || — || December 17, 2001 || Socorro || LINEAR || — || align=right | 2.0 km || 
|-id=963 bgcolor=#fefefe
| 94963 ||  || — || December 17, 2001 || Socorro || LINEAR || — || align=right | 1.9 km || 
|-id=964 bgcolor=#fefefe
| 94964 ||  || — || December 17, 2001 || Socorro || LINEAR || — || align=right | 1.4 km || 
|-id=965 bgcolor=#E9E9E9
| 94965 ||  || — || December 17, 2001 || Socorro || LINEAR || — || align=right | 2.0 km || 
|-id=966 bgcolor=#E9E9E9
| 94966 ||  || — || December 17, 2001 || Socorro || LINEAR || HOF || align=right | 4.8 km || 
|-id=967 bgcolor=#E9E9E9
| 94967 ||  || — || December 17, 2001 || Socorro || LINEAR || AER || align=right | 2.9 km || 
|-id=968 bgcolor=#fefefe
| 94968 ||  || — || December 17, 2001 || Socorro || LINEAR || — || align=right | 1.9 km || 
|-id=969 bgcolor=#fefefe
| 94969 ||  || — || December 17, 2001 || Socorro || LINEAR || FLO || align=right | 1.4 km || 
|-id=970 bgcolor=#fefefe
| 94970 ||  || — || December 17, 2001 || Socorro || LINEAR || — || align=right | 1.9 km || 
|-id=971 bgcolor=#fefefe
| 94971 ||  || — || December 18, 2001 || Socorro || LINEAR || — || align=right | 2.5 km || 
|-id=972 bgcolor=#fefefe
| 94972 ||  || — || December 18, 2001 || Socorro || LINEAR || — || align=right | 2.3 km || 
|-id=973 bgcolor=#fefefe
| 94973 ||  || — || December 18, 2001 || Anderson Mesa || LONEOS || — || align=right | 1.7 km || 
|-id=974 bgcolor=#fefefe
| 94974 ||  || — || December 18, 2001 || Anderson Mesa || LONEOS || V || align=right | 1.5 km || 
|-id=975 bgcolor=#fefefe
| 94975 ||  || — || December 18, 2001 || Anderson Mesa || LONEOS || — || align=right | 2.0 km || 
|-id=976 bgcolor=#fefefe
| 94976 ||  || — || December 19, 2001 || Socorro || LINEAR || V || align=right | 1.3 km || 
|-id=977 bgcolor=#fefefe
| 94977 ||  || — || December 19, 2001 || Socorro || LINEAR || NYS || align=right | 1.3 km || 
|-id=978 bgcolor=#fefefe
| 94978 ||  || — || December 18, 2001 || Palomar || NEAT || — || align=right | 2.5 km || 
|-id=979 bgcolor=#fefefe
| 94979 ||  || — || December 17, 2001 || Socorro || LINEAR || — || align=right | 1.7 km || 
|-id=980 bgcolor=#E9E9E9
| 94980 ||  || — || December 17, 2001 || Socorro || LINEAR || — || align=right | 4.7 km || 
|-id=981 bgcolor=#E9E9E9
| 94981 ||  || — || December 17, 2001 || Socorro || LINEAR || — || align=right | 3.0 km || 
|-id=982 bgcolor=#E9E9E9
| 94982 ||  || — || December 17, 2001 || Socorro || LINEAR || MAR || align=right | 2.6 km || 
|-id=983 bgcolor=#fefefe
| 94983 ||  || — || December 18, 2001 || Socorro || LINEAR || FLO || align=right | 1.2 km || 
|-id=984 bgcolor=#fefefe
| 94984 ||  || — || December 18, 2001 || Socorro || LINEAR || FLO || align=right | 1.4 km || 
|-id=985 bgcolor=#fefefe
| 94985 ||  || — || December 18, 2001 || Socorro || LINEAR || NYS || align=right | 1.4 km || 
|-id=986 bgcolor=#fefefe
| 94986 ||  || — || December 18, 2001 || Socorro || LINEAR || NYS || align=right | 2.7 km || 
|-id=987 bgcolor=#fefefe
| 94987 ||  || — || December 18, 2001 || Socorro || LINEAR || NYS || align=right | 2.6 km || 
|-id=988 bgcolor=#fefefe
| 94988 ||  || — || December 19, 2001 || Socorro || LINEAR || — || align=right | 1.5 km || 
|-id=989 bgcolor=#fefefe
| 94989 ||  || — || December 20, 2001 || Socorro || LINEAR || — || align=right | 1.4 km || 
|-id=990 bgcolor=#fefefe
| 94990 ||  || — || December 20, 2001 || Socorro || LINEAR || NYS || align=right | 1.4 km || 
|-id=991 bgcolor=#fefefe
| 94991 ||  || — || December 17, 2001 || Socorro || LINEAR || — || align=right | 4.3 km || 
|-id=992 bgcolor=#fefefe
| 94992 ||  || — || December 17, 2001 || Socorro || LINEAR || — || align=right | 2.1 km || 
|-id=993 bgcolor=#fefefe
| 94993 ||  || — || December 17, 2001 || Socorro || LINEAR || — || align=right | 2.0 km || 
|-id=994 bgcolor=#fefefe
| 94994 ||  || — || December 17, 2001 || Socorro || LINEAR || V || align=right | 1.2 km || 
|-id=995 bgcolor=#fefefe
| 94995 ||  || — || December 20, 2001 || Socorro || LINEAR || — || align=right | 3.6 km || 
|-id=996 bgcolor=#fefefe
| 94996 ||  || — || December 18, 2001 || Kitt Peak || Spacewatch || — || align=right | 1.4 km || 
|-id=997 bgcolor=#fefefe
| 94997 ||  || — || December 22, 2001 || Socorro || LINEAR || V || align=right | 1.4 km || 
|-id=998 bgcolor=#E9E9E9
| 94998 ||  || — || December 21, 2001 || Haleakala || NEAT || — || align=right | 4.6 km || 
|-id=999 bgcolor=#E9E9E9
| 94999 ||  || — || December 18, 2001 || Kitt Peak || Spacewatch || — || align=right | 2.4 km || 
|-id=000 bgcolor=#fefefe
| 95000 ||  || — || December 24, 2001 || Haleakala || NEAT || — || align=right | 2.4 km || 
|}

References

External links 
 Discovery Circumstances: Numbered Minor Planets (90001)–(95000) (IAU Minor Planet Center)

0094